= Nikola Buranská =

Czech beauty pageant

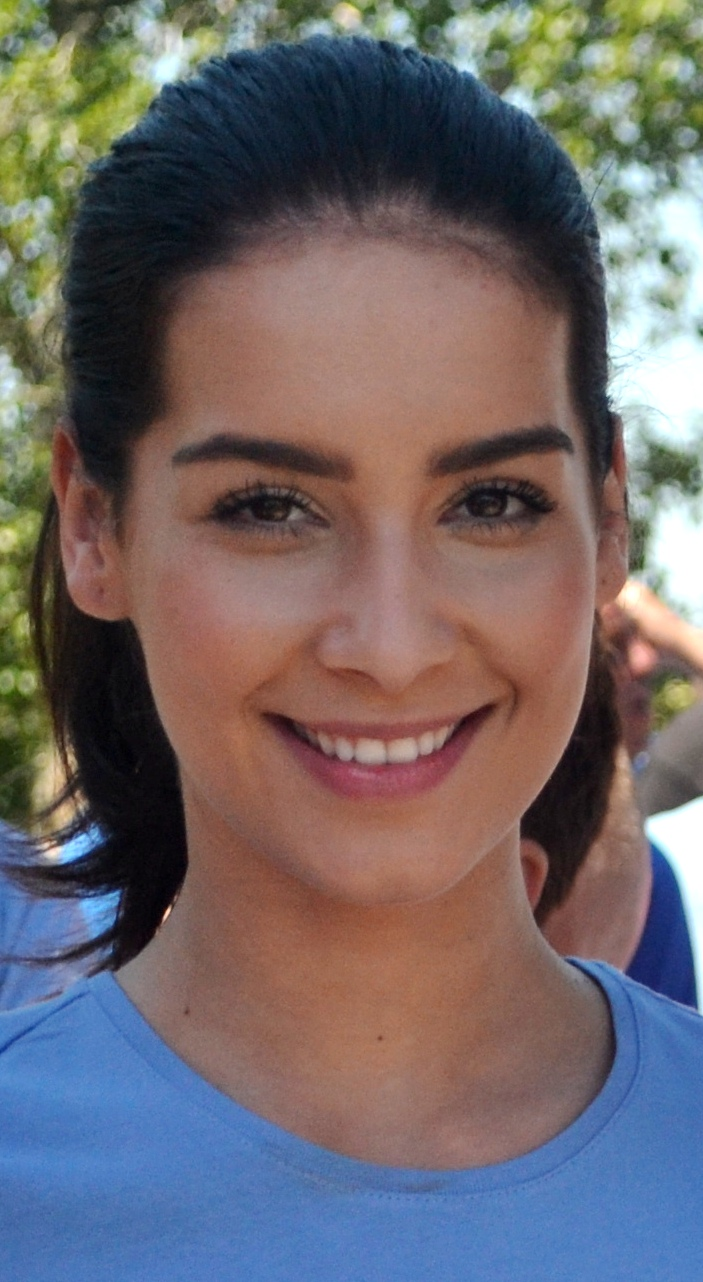
- Born: May 1992 (age 34); Přerov, Czechoslovakia
- Height: 1.77 m (5 ft 9 1/2 in)
- Beauty pageant titleholder
- Title: Česká Miss 2014 (2nd Runner-up)
- Hair color: Brown
- Eye color: Brown
- Major competitions: Česká Miss 2014 (2nd Runner-up); Miss Earth 2014 (Miss Placenta)

Nikola Buranská is a Czech model and beauty pageant titleholder who was crowned Česká Miss Earth 2014 and represented the Czech Republic at Miss Earth 2014. She won alongside Gabriela Franková and Tereza Skoumalová.

== Biography ==
=== Early life and career beginnings ===
Buranská came from Přerov where she graduated high school. She went to Liberec where she studied at Metropolitan University Prague, taking up Public Administration. Nikola also speaks English and German languages because she believes in the saying, "How many words you know, the more of a person you are". She wants to learn other languages including Italian and Spanish in the future.

She has been in a relationship with Czech Republic football player Filip Novák since 2010 and they have been living together since 2011.

Nikola has also worked as a model in Milan, London and in Paris.

== Pageantry ==
=== Česká Miss 2012 ===
Nikola first tried her luck in the world of pageantry via Česká Miss but she was unplaced.

=== Česká Miss 2014 ===
Nikola once again tried to become a beauty queen again at Česká Miss. But this time, she won the internet votes that gave her the right to earn the title of Blesk Česka Miss Earth 2014. Weeks before the finals night, Nikola suffered from her injured foot which she got while they were in Mauritius. The doctor almost had to put in injections that eventually did not get to materialize.

=== Miss Earth 2014 ===
"I am grateful to know that beauty of people is connected to nature because, in the end, people and environment are one integrated complex."

— Nikola Buranská's message for Miss Earth.

By winning Miss Earth Czech Republic, Nikola flew to the Philippines in November to compete with almost 100 other candidates to be Alyz Henrich's successor as Miss Earth.

As a Miss Earth delegate, an environmental advocacy is must. When she was asked about her advocacy for the pageant, she answered, "For a cleaner and healthier world, I'm willing to give up everything that negatively affects the environment – I personally use public transport, which certainly promotes healthier air in the city where I live." Nikola also added, "Ecological lifestyle means for me regular waste management, use of public transport, limiting the use of household chemicals when cleaning, organic food shopping in specialty stores or at farmers markets."

When she was asked about what to promote in her country, Czech Republic, Nikola answered her country's architecture and history. Nikola also said that Czech Republic is surrounded by "...mountains, nature preserves and national parks." She also mentioned about her people's kind hearts and traditions that they love to show to all people from different walks of life.

At the conclusion of the pageant, she was unplaced. The Miss Earth 2014 title was won by Jamie Herrell of the Philippines.

Awards and achievements
Preceded by Monika Leová	Miss Earth Czech Republic; 2014	Succeeded by Karolina Malisova
