= Otice =

- Municipality
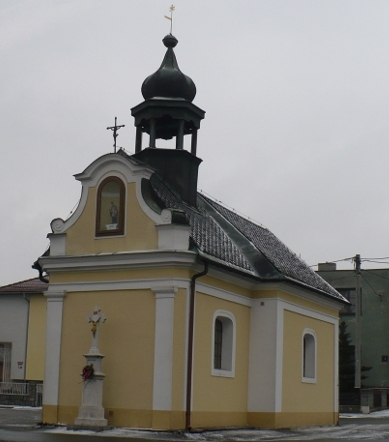
- Chapel of the Annunciation

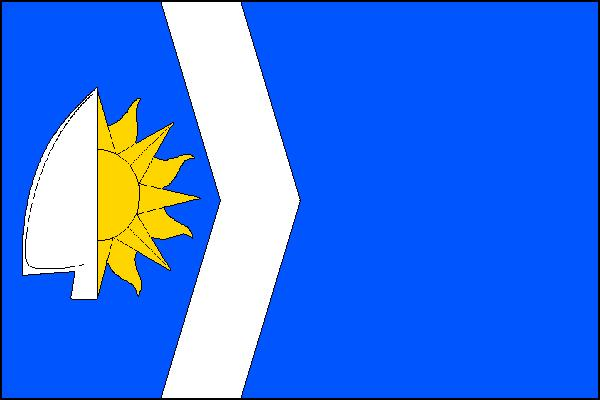
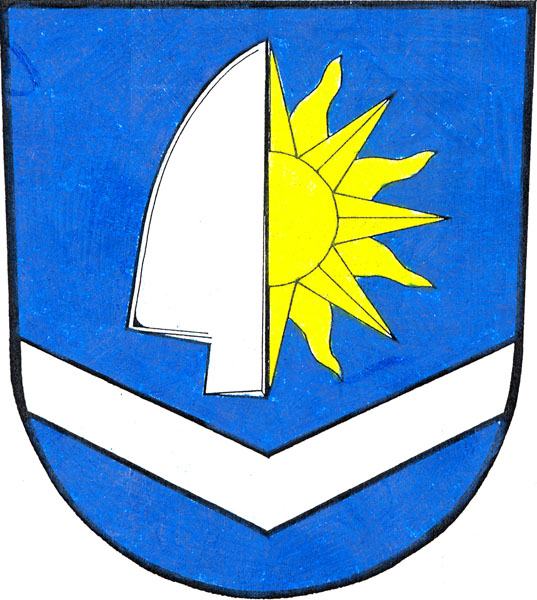
- Flag Coat of arms

- Location in the Czech Republic
- Coordinates: 49°55′0″N 17°52′12″E
- Country: Czech Republic
- Region: Moravian-Silesian
- District: Opava
- First mentioned: 1361

Area
  - Total: 7.20 km^{2} (2.78 sq mi)
- Elevation: 258 m (846 ft)

Population (2026-01-01)
  - Total: 1,525
  - Density: 212/km^{2} (549/sq mi)
- Time zone: UTC+1 (CET)
  - Summer (DST): UTC+2 (CEST)
- Postal code: 747 81
- Website: www.otice.cz

Otice (Czech pronunciation: [ˈocɪtsɛ]; German: Ottendorf) is a municipality and village in Opava District in the Moravian-Silesian Region of the Czech Republic. It has about 1,500 inhabitants.

== History ==
The first written mention of Otice is from 1361.

== Demographics ==
Historical population
Year	Pop.	±%
1869	644	—
1880	726	+12.7%
1890	821	+13.1%
1900	819	−0.2%
1910	867	+5.9%
1921	900	+3.8%
1930	1,135	+26.1%
1950	850	−25.1%
1961	958	+12.7%
1970	993	+3.7%
1980	1,156	+16.4%
1991	1,265	+9.4%
2001	1,282	+1.3%
2011	1,311	+2.3%
2021	1,393	+6.3%
Source: Censuses

== Transport ==
Otice is located on the railway line from Opava to Svobodné Heřmanice, but trains run on it only on weekends.

== Notable people ==
- Josef Erber (1897–1987), Czech-German SS officer
- Karolína Mališová (born 1996), model, Czech Miss Earth 2015
