= Jitka Boho =

Czech model, singer, beauty pageant titleholder

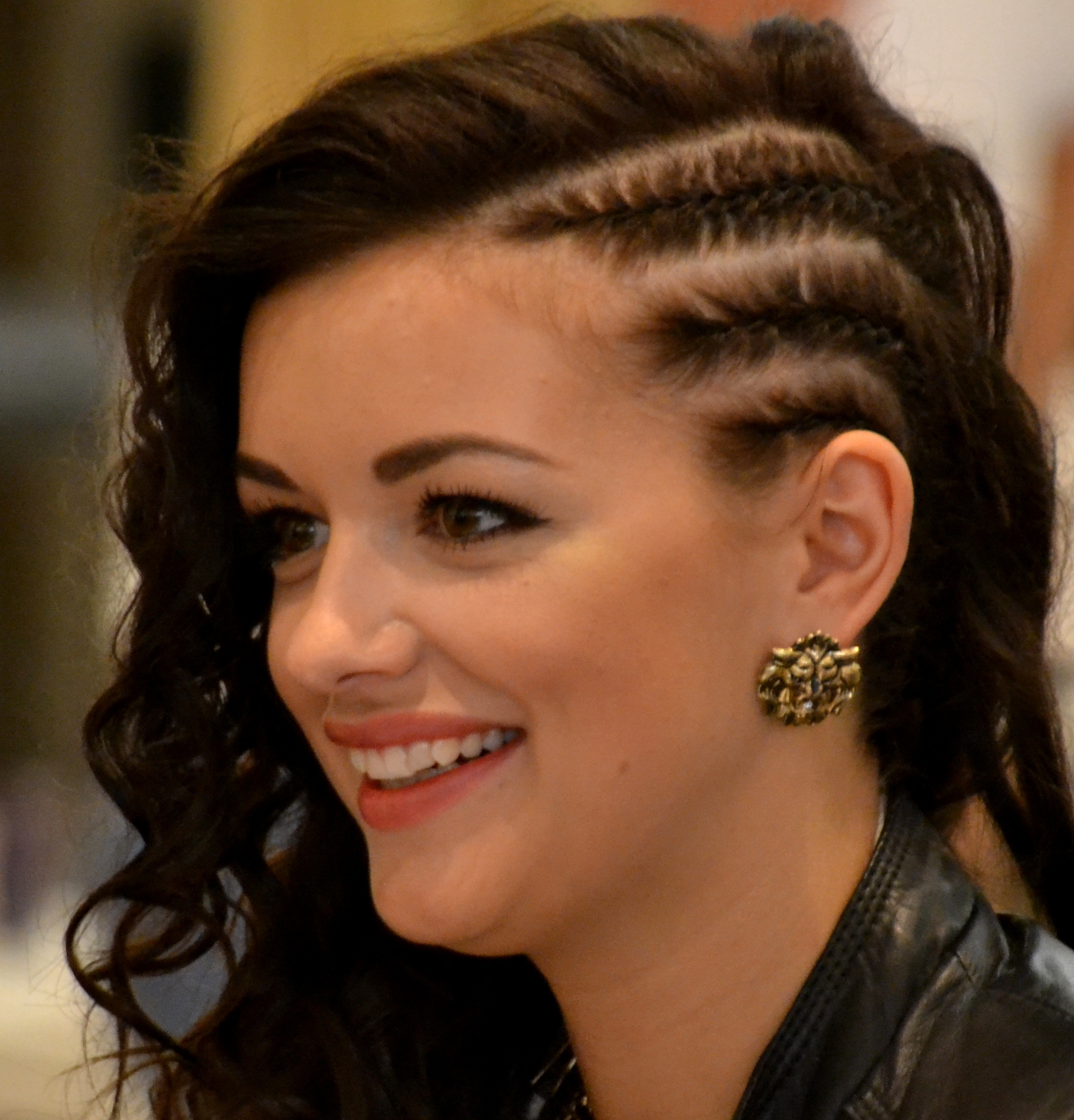
- Born: Jitka Válková; 11 November 1991 (age 34); Třebíč, Czechoslovakia
- Height: 1.69 m (5 ft 6 1/2 in)
- Spouse: Lukáš Boho (m. 2015–2020)
- Beauty pageant titleholder
- Title: Česká Miss 2010
- Hair color: Brown
- Eye color: Light green
- Major competition: Česká Miss 2010 (Winner); Miss Universe 2010 (Top 15)

Jitka Boho, née Válková (born 11 November 1991) is a Czech singer, former model and beauty pageant titleholder who won Česká Miss 2010 and finished in the top 15 in Miss Universe 2010.

== Early life ==
Originally from Třebíč, Válkova studied at a Catholic Grammar School. She became the sixth Česká Miss and was crowned by Iveta Lutovská, Česká Miss 2009.

== Miss Universe 2010 ==
At 18, Válková became one of the youngest contestants to finish in the Top 15 and competed in the swimsuit round during the finals of Miss Universe 2010, held on 23 August 2010 in Paradise, Nevada.

She earned the Czech Republic's fourth consecutive placement in the Miss Universe pageant.

== Personal life ==
In July 2015 Válková married drummer Lukáš Boho at Měřín and also announced her pregnancy. Their daughter Rozálie was born in November. In September 2019 the couple split. She gave birth to a son in October 2022 with her boyfriend Tomáš Hřebík.

Awards and achievements
Preceded by Iveta Lutovská	Czech Miss; 2010	Succeeded by Jitka Nováčková
