= Šárka Cojocarová =

Czech model (born 1989)

Šárka Klemensová
- Born: Šárka Cojocarová; 16 January 1989 (age 37); Svobodné Heřmanice, Czechoslovakia
- Height: 1.78 m (5 ft 10 in)
- Spouse: Karel Klemens (m. 2013)
- Children: 2
- Beauty pageant titleholder
- Title: Miss Dream Girl of the World 2008; Miss Earth Czech Republic 2011
- Hair color: Brown
- Eye color: Green
- Major competitions: Miss Dream Girl of the World 2008 (Winner); Czech Miss 2011 (Miss Earth Czech Republic 2011); Miss Earth 2011 (Unplaced); Miss Exclusive of the World 2012 (2nd Runner-up)

Šárka Klemensová (born 16 January 1989 as Šárka Cojocarová) is a Czech model and beauty pageant titleholder who won Czech Miss Earth 2011.

== Biography ==
Cojocarová was born in Svobodné Heřmanice. She graduated from high school in Ostrava-Poruba. She currently studies English and French at the philosophy faculty of the University of Ostrava. She also speaks Spanish and Russian.

She has participated in the Miss Model Girl of the Year competition, and won first place at the Junior Miss ČR 2004 and the 2006 Miss Renata.

== Miss Earth 2011 ==
In 2011 she took part in the Czech Miss competition. At the gala held on 19 March 2011, she won the Miss Earth 2011 title. At the Miss Earth contest, which took place at the Filipino Manilách, she was awarded "The most beautiful body in bikini" (Best in Swimsuit) title.

Awards and achievements
Preceded by Carmen Justová	Miss Earth Czech Republic; 2011	Succeeded by Tereza Fajksová
