= Edina Kulcsár =

Hungarian model (born 1990)

- Born: 23 December 1990 (age 35); Budapest, Hungary
- Occupation: Model
- Height: 1.73 m (5 ft 8 in)
- Beauty pageant titleholder
- Title: Miss World Hungary 2014
- Hair colour: Brown
- Eye colour: Hazel
- Major competitions: Miss World Hungary 2014 (Winner); Miss World 2014 (1st Runner-Up)

Edina Kulcsár (born 23 December 1990) is a Hungarian model and beauty pageant titleholder who was crowned Miss World Hungary 2014 and represented the country at Miss World 2014 where she was first runner-up.

== Pageantry ==
=== Miss World Hungary 2014 ===
She was crowned as Miss World Hungary 2014, representing Budapest.

=== Miss World 2014 ===
She competed at Miss World 2014 in London on 14 December 2014. She was first runner-up.

Awards and achievements
Preceded by (France) Marine Lorphelin	Miss World 1st Runner Up; 2014	Succeeded by (Russia) Sofia Nikitchuk
Preceded by (France) Marine Lorphelin	Miss World Europe; 2014	Succeeded by (Spain) Mireia Lalaguna
Preceded by Rákosi Annamária	Miss World Hungary; 2014	Succeeded by Daniella Kiss
