= Lillian Lightbourn =

Miss World Bermuda 2014 title holder

Lillian Lightbourn is a Bermudian model and beauty pageant titleholder who was crowned Miss World Bermuda 2014 and represented her country at the Miss World 2014 pageant in London, England.

Lightbourn first experienced the catwalk while participating in The Berkeley Institute’s 2007 graduation fashion show.

She is currently represented by Trump Model Management and has been featured in Harper's Bazaar, Glamour UK, Cosmopolitan UK, Nylon magazines, and many more.

She is a member of The Rock Church NYC.
