= Ioánna Filíppou =

Cypriot model (born 1995)

Ioanna Filippou
- Born: 1995 (age 30–31); Nicosia, Cyprus
- Beauty pageant titleholder
- Title: Star Cyprus 2013 (Miss World Cyprus)
- Hair color: Brown
- Eye color: Green
- Major competitions: Star Cyprus 2013 (1st Runner-up); Miss World 2014 (Unplaced)

Ioanna Filippou (Greek: Ιωάννα Φιλίππου, born 1995) is a Cypriot model and beauty pageant titleholder. She holds the title Miss World Kypros 2013. At the Star Kypros, she was crowned as the second title who was represented Cyprus at Miss World 2014.

== Star Cyprus 2013 ==
Eventually, Elisa Georgiou won the title of Star Cyprus 2013 and she also won the title of Miss Fantastic in 2013. She is preparing to compete at Miss Universe 2014. The Runners-up were getting the title as Miss Cyprus, Miss Carlsberg and Miss Mediterranean and also will represent Cyprus at International Pageants. Ioanna Filippou was crowned as the second title of the pageant.
