= Gabriela Kratochvílová =

Czech model and anchor (born 1990)

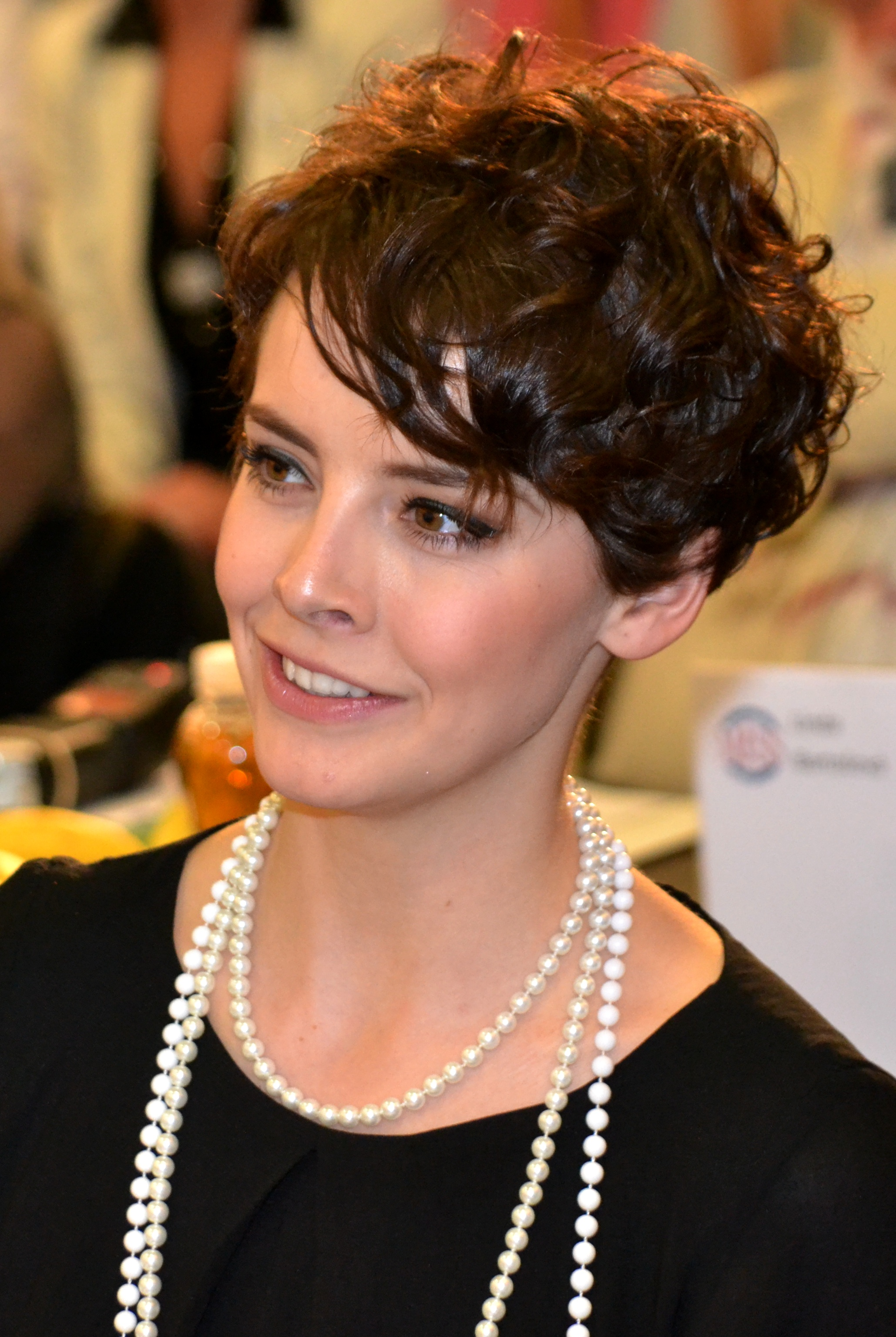
- Born: Gabriela Kratochvílová; 11 February 1990 (age 36); Chotěboř, Czechoslovakia
- Height: 1.73 m (5 ft 8 in)
- Beauty pageant titleholder
- Title: Czech Miss 2013
- Hair color: Black
- Major competitions: Czech Miss 2013 (Winner); Miss Universe 2013 (Unplaced)

Gabriela Lašková (née Kratochvílová; born 11 February 1990) is a Czech model, anchor, and beauty pageant titleholder who was crowned Czech Miss 2013 and represented Czech Republic at Miss Universe 2013. From 2014 until 2023, she was an anchor of the main news program on the Czech TV station Prima.

== Czech Miss 2013 ==
The ninth edition of the Czech Miss beauty contest occurred on 23 March 2013 at the Karlín Musical Theatre. Throughout the evening, ten finalists performed in traditional disciplines such as a swimsuit walk, but also in non-traditional disciplines of the competition.

Awards and achievements
Preceded by Tereza Chlebovská	Czech Miss; 2013	Succeeded by Gabriela Franková
