= Miss Chad =

Beauty contest

Miss Chad (Tchad)
- Formation: 2004
- Type: Beauty pageant
- Headquarters: N'Djamena
- Location: Chad
- Members: Miss World; Miss Earth
- Official language: French
- Key people: Ministry of Culture, Chad

Miss Chad (also known as "Miss TCHAD") is a national Beauty pageant in Chad. The pageant runs to select its winner to the Miss World and Miss Earth pageants.

== Titleholders ==
Year	Miss Tchad	Placement at Miss World
2014	Sakadi Djivra	The People's Choice (Top 10)
2015	Élise Dagossé	Did not compete
2016	Sylviane Leloum	Did not compete
2017	Mingar Beimbaye	Did not compete
2019	Caltouma Sindigue	Did not compete
2020	Ronelyam Syam Grâce	Due to the spread of the COVID-19 pandemic, Miss World Cancelled the 2020 Pageant.

Year	Miss Chad	Placement at Miss Earth
2004	Myriam Commelin	Unplaced
