= María José Alvarado =

Honduran beauty queen (1995–2014)

- Born: María José Alvarado Muñoz; 19 July 1995; Santa Bárbara, Honduras
- Died: 13 November 2014 (aged 19); Cablotales, Honduras
- Beauty pageant titleholder
- Title: Miss Honduras 2014
- Major competition: Miss World 2014 (did not compete)

María José Alvarado Muñoz (19 July 1995 – 13 November 2014) was a Honduran model, television host, and beauty pageant titleholder who was crowned Miss World Honduras 2014. She was supposed to represent Honduras at Miss World 2014 held in London, but was murdered prior to the event.

== Biography ==
María José Alvarado Muñoz was born on 19 July 1995, in Santa Bárbara, Honduras. Prior to her beauty pageant debut, she was a contestant on X-O da dinero.

=== Murder ===
On the night of 13 November 2014, Alvarado and her older sister, Sofía Trinidad Alvarado Muñoz, disappeared after leaving a party in Santa Bárbara, Honduras. According to witnesses she stepped into a car without license plates. On 19 November, the same day Alvarado had been expected to travel to London, the sisters' bodies were found. They had both been shot and buried in a field near Cablotales. Plutarco Ruiz, Sofía Trinidad's boyfriend, as well as another man, Aris Maldonado, were arrested on suspicion of kidnapping and murder of the two sisters. Ruiz confessed to the murders, stating he had shot Sofía Trinidad after an argument on the night of the party, then shot Alvarado twice in the back as she tried to flee. It was announced the same day that Honduras would not send a replacement to the Miss World pageant as a sign of respect for Alvarado.

The chairwoman of the Miss World organization Julia Morley released a statement "to everyone around the world who has been touched by the awful news from Honduras this morning [...] We are devastated by this terrible loss of two young women, who were so full of life. Our thoughts and prayers are with the family and friends of Maria Jose Alvarado and Sofía Trinidad at this time of grief". Morley also stated the Miss World pageant would hold a special memorial service for María José and her sister on 23 November 2014.

== See also ==
- Femicides in Honduras
