= Tereza Fajksová =

Czech model and beauty queen

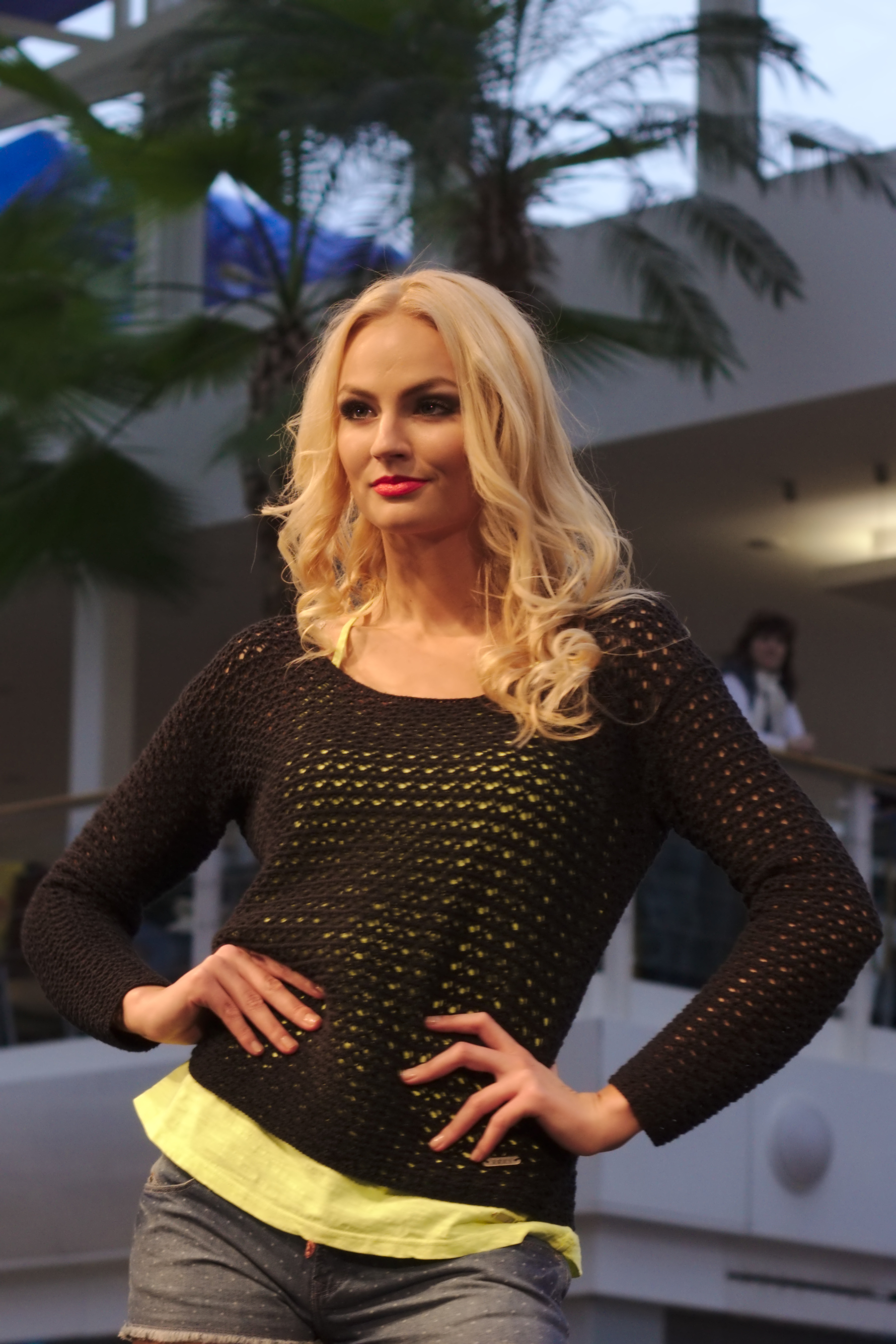
- Fajksová in 2013
- Born: Tereza Fajksová; 17 May 1989 (age 37); Ivančice, Czechoslovakia
- Occupation: Model
- Height: 1.79 m (5 ft 10 1/2 in)
- Children: 2
- Beauty pageant titleholder
- Title: Miss Earth Czech Republic 2012; Miss Earth 2012
- Hair color: Blonde
- Eye color: Blue
- Major competitions: Czech Miss 2012 (Miss Earth Czech Republic 2012); Miss Earth 2012 (Winner)

Tereza Fajksová (born 17 May 1989) is a Czech model and beauty queen who won Miss Earth 2012. Fajksová is the first delegate from the Czech Republic to win the Miss Earth title.

== Biography ==
Fajksová comes from the small town of Ivančice in the Czech Republic. She has natural blonde hair and blue eyes. She attended TG Masaryk elementary school in Ivančice, and high school at the Ludvík Daněk Sports Gymnasium in Brno. She has lived in Brno since her high school years.

Fajksová is a Public Administration graduate of Mendel University in Brno. Before she started her modeling career, she was a volleyball player. As captain of the team from Brno (Brno Kralovopolska Extraliga Volleyball Team), her team won three junior national championships in the Czech Republic. Her career in volleyball ended when she had an injury which paved her way in the world of fashion and modeling.

== Pageantry ==
=== Early career ===
Fajksová was a finalist in the 2009 edition of Miss Czech Republic. She placed second runner-up in Miss Tourism Queen of the Year International 2010 and placed in the Top 24 of Miss Bikini International 2011.

=== Czech Miss 2012 ===
Fajksová competed in the 2012 edition of the annual Czech Miss beauty pageant which was held on 31 March 2012 at the Karlin Musical Theatre, Prague. She emerged as one of the three winners and bagged the title "Czech Miss Earth 2012" which earned her the right to represent the Czech Republic in the Miss Earth 2012 international pageant.

=== Miss Earth 2012 ===
At the age of 23, Fajksová was crowned Miss Earth 2012, during the 12th Miss Earth coronation night held at the Versailles Palace in Alabang, Muntinlupa, Philippines. She beat 79 other international delegates in a competition that took sustainable energy as its central theme, following the United Nations General Assembly's declaration of 2012 International Year of Sustainable Energy for All. She became the first delegate from the Czech Republic to win the Miss Earth title.

The top four delegates were asked one question prior to the conclusion of the pageant, "What is your defining moment as a woman?" Fajksová, without the assistance of an interpreter, acknowledged her disfluency in the English language, and replied: "I’m so sorry but I don’t understand the question. I will try to send this message: We have to protect Mother Earth. She gives us everything we need in our lives. So let’s respect her so she’ll respect us."

She fell to the ground after being crowned by her predecessor, the Ecuadorian Olga Álava and suffered an ankle injury.

== Media and environmental activism ==
Fajksová took part in the Inquirer Read-Along Festival on 26 November 2012, reading the story of "Amansinaya" to nearly one thousand children at the Ninoy Aquino Parks and Wildlife Center in Quezon City.

She was a guest at the Czech Republic dance show contest, Star Dance with actor David Švehlík on 15 December 2012. and upon returning to the Czech Republic she was welcomed by her community and children in Ivančice and received an honorary award from the mayor of Ivančice.

In March 2013 she appeared on Czech cooking show VIP Prostřeno where she prepared and cooked a four-course menu of French cuisine. Later that month, she crowned her national successor, Monika Leová as Miss Earth Czech Republic 2013.

On 6 April 2013, Tereza traveled to the island of Réunion in the Indian Ocean, to grace and to serve as a chief judge of Miss Earth Reunion Island 2013 pageant. On 9 April 2013, the newly crowned Miss Earth Reunion, Chrystelle Abrantes, Tereza and national director Julie Nauche traveled to Mauritius to support the contestants of Miss Earth Mauritius 2013. She met President of Mauritius Kailash Purryag to discuss about environment issues and Led Mauritius' National Day of Mourning lay flowers to honor the dead people in floods and visitation of Sugar Plantation in Port Louis, Mauritius. As a celebration of World Earth Day on 22 April, Fajksová and others planted 3,000 seedlings of trees in Jakarta, Indonesia. Her daughter Lilien was born in 2019, and her son Sebastien was born in 2021 by her partner Luboš Gregor.

Awards and achievements
Preceded by (Ecuador) Olga Álava	Miss Earth; 2012	Succeeded by (Venezuela) Alyz Henrich
Preceded by Šárka Cojocarová	Miss Earth Czech Republic; 2012	Succeeded by Monika Leová
