= Miss World 2014 =

64th Miss World Pageant

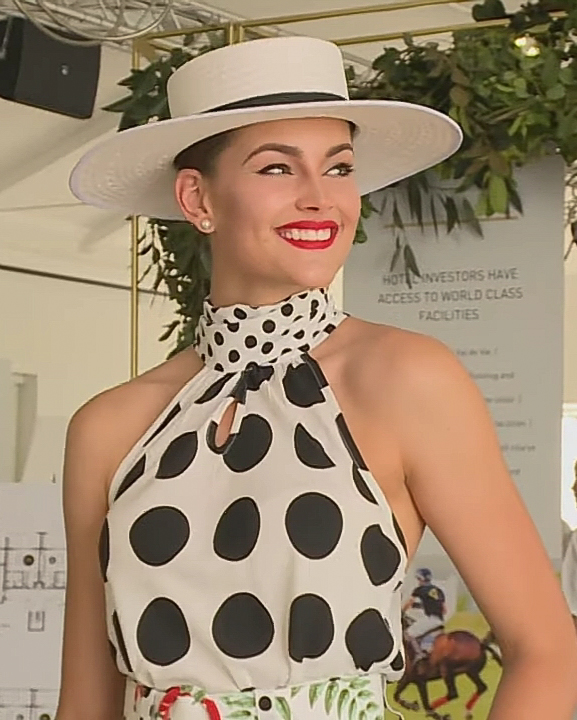
- Rolene Strauss
- Date: 14 December 2014
- Presenters: Tim Vincent; Megan Young; Frankie Cena; Steve Douglas
- Entertainment: Sky Blu; The Vamps
- Venue: ExCeL London, London, United Kingdom
- Broadcaster: E!; London Live
- Entrants: 121
- Placements: 25
- Debuts: Chad; São Tomé and Príncipe
- Withdrawals: Angola; Botswana; Bulgaria; Chile; Dominica; Guinea-Bissau; Honduras; Kazakhstan; Macedonia; Saint Kitts and Nevis; Samoa; Taiwan; Uzbekistan; Zambia
- Returns: Egypt; Israel; Luxembourg; Myanmar; Uruguay; Zimbabwe
- Winner: Rolene Strauss, South Africa

Miss World 2014 was the 64th edition of the Miss World pageant, held at ExCeL London in London, United Kingdom, on 14 December 2014.

At the end of the event, Rolene Strauss of South Africa was crowned Miss World 2014 by Megan Young of the Philippines. This is the second time that South Africa has won the title outright and marking the country's first victory after 40 years, and their overall third victory in the pageant's history. The first runner-up was Edina Kulcsá representing Hungary, and the second runner-up was Elizabeth Safrit representing the United States.

== Background ==
=== Debuts, returns, and, withdrawals ===
This edition marked the debut of Chad and São Tomé and Príncipe, and the return of Egypt, Israel, Luxembourg, Myanmar, Uruguay and Zimbabwe; Myanmar, which last competed (as Burma) in 1960, Luxembourg in 2010, Egypt in 2011, and Israel, Uruguay and Zimbabwe in 2012.

Angola, Botswana, Bulgaria, Chile, Dominica, Guinea-Bissau, Honduras, Kazakhstan, Macedonia, Saint Kitts and Nevis, Samoa, Taiwan, Uzbekistan and Zambia, withdrew from the competition.

=== Miss Honduras ===
In April 2014, María José Alvarado won Miss Honduras World. She was expected to represent Honduras and was scheduled to fly to London, England for the Miss World pageant. On 19 November 2014, Alvarado and her sister Sofía Trinidad were found murdered and then buried in the village of Cablotales. Miss Honduras pageant organizers decided not to replace Alvarado and the country officially withdrew from the contest. On 23 November 2014, Miss World Organization Chairperson Julia Morley gave a special memorial service in remembrance for her and her sister.

== Results ==
=== Placements ===
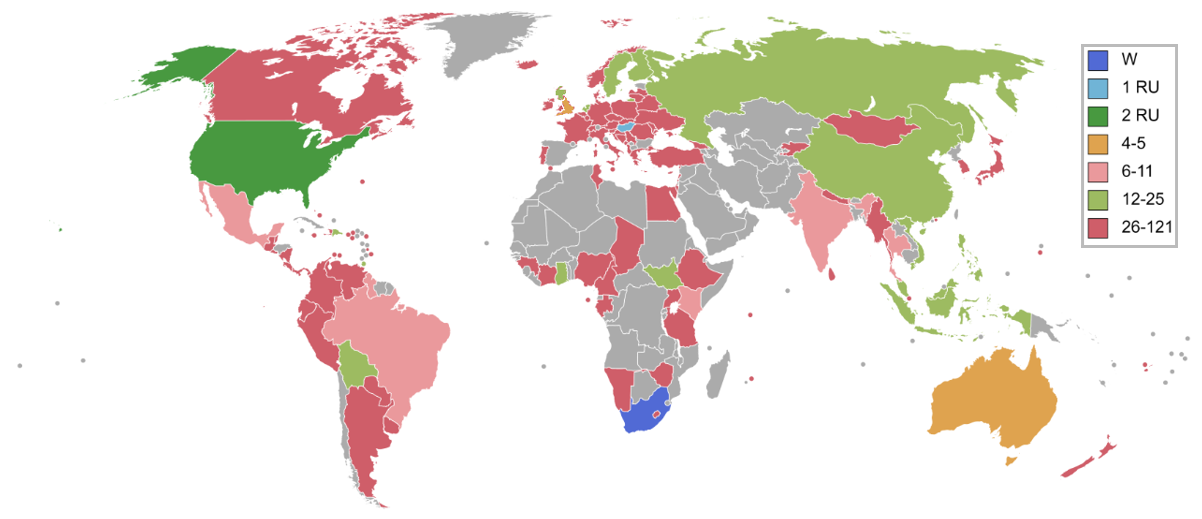
Miss world 2014 participating countries and territories

Placement	Contestant
Miss World 2014	South Africa – Rolene Strauss
1st Runner-Up	Hungary – Edina Kulcsár
2nd Runner-Up	United States – Elizabeth Safrit
Top 5	Australia – Courtney Thorpe; England – Carina Tyrrell
Top 11	Brazil – Julia Gama; Guyana – Rafieya Husain; India – Koyal Rana; Kenya – Idah Nguma; Mexico – Daniela Álvarez; Thailand – Nonthawan Thongleng §
Top 25	Bolivia – Andrea Forfori; China – Du Yang; Dominican Republic – Dhío Moreno; Finland – Krista Haapalainen; Ghana – Nadia Ntanu; Indonesia – Maria Rahajeng; Malaysia – Dewi Liana Seriestha; Netherlands – Tatjana Maul; Philippines – Valerie Weigmann; Russia – Anastasia Kostenko; Scotland – Ellie McKeating; South Sudan – Awien Kuanyin-Agoth; Sweden – Olivia Asplund; Trinidad and Tobago – Sarah Waddell; Vietnam – Nguyễn Thị Loan

§ – People's Choice winner

== Challenge Events ==
=== Beach Beauty ===
Placement	Contestant
Winner	Sweden – Olivia Asplund
Top 5	India – Koyal Rana; Kenya – Idah Nguma; Mexico – Daniela Álvarez; South Africa – Rolene Strauss

=== Beauty With a Purpose ===
Placement	Contestant
Winner(s)	Brazil – Julia Gama; Guyana – Rafieya Husain; India – Koyal Rana; Indonesia – Maria Rahajeng; Kenya – Idah Nguma
Top 10	Bolivia – Andrea Forfori; England – Carina Tyrrell; Netherlands – Tatjana Maul; Philippines – Valerie Weigmann; South Africa – Rolene Strauss

=== Multimedia ===
Placement	Contestant
Winner	United States – Elizabeth Safrit
Top 5	England – Carina Tyrrell; Guyana – Rafieya Husain; India – Koyal Rana; Netherlands – Tatjana Maul

=== Sport ===
Placement	Contestant
Winner	Finland – Krista Haapalainen
Runner-Up	Hungary – Edina Kulcsár
3rd Place	South Africa – Rolene Strauss
4th Place	Serbia – Milica Vuklis
5th Place	South Africa – Alice Ford

=== Talent ===
Placement	Contestant
Winner	Malaysia – Dewi Liana Seriestha
Runner-Up	Scotland – Ellie McKeating
Top 5	Russia – Anastasia Kostenko; Sweden – Olivia Asplund; United States – Elizabeth Safrit

=== Top Model ===
Placement	Contestant
Winner	Bosnia and Herzegovina – Isidora Borovčanin
Top 5	Australia – Courtney Thorpe; China – Du Yang; Hungary – Edina Kulcsár; South Africa – Awien Kuanyin-Agoth

== Judges ==
The judges for Miss World 2014 were:

- Julia Morley – Chairman of the Miss World Organization
- Mike Dixon – Musical Director
- Rudy Salles – Member of the National Assembly of France
- Jody Reynolds – former president of Variety International
- Marsha-Rae Ratcliff – Variety International board member
- Tony Hatch – British most celebrated musical acts and films
- Agbani Darego – Miss World 2001 from Nigeria
- Azra Akın – Miss World 2002 from Turkey
- Zhang Zilin – Miss World 2007 from China
- Kaiane Aldorino – Miss World 2009 from Gibraltar
- Mike Dixon – Musical director

== Contestants ==
121 contestants competed for the title.

Country/Territory	Contestant	Age (Note: Ages at the time in the pageant)	Hometown
Albania	Xhensila Pere	25	Pogradec
Argentina	Yoana Don	23	Santiago del Estero
Aruba	Joitza Henriquez	21	Oranjestad
Australia	Courtney Thorpe	23	Brisbane
Austria	Julia Furdea	20	Asten
Bahamas	Rosetta Cartwright	19	Nassau
Barbados	Zoé Trotman	22	Bridgetown
Belarus	Viktoria Mihanovich	21	Minsk
Belgium	Anissa Blondin	22	Brussels
Belize	Raquel Badillo	21	Belize City
Bermuda	Lillian Lightbourn	24	Hamilton
Bolivia	Andrea Forfori	25	Santa Cruz de la Sierra
Bosnia and Herzegovina	Isidora Borovčanin	19	Pale
Brazil	Julia Gama	21	Porto Alegre
British Virgin Islands	Rosanna Chichester	25	Road Town
Cameroon	Larissa Ngangoum	24	Yaoundé
Canada	Annora Bourgeault	21	Regina
Chad	Sakadi Djivira	21	Abéché
China	Du Yang	22	Beijing
Colombia	Leandra García	21	Cali
Costa Rica	Natasha Sibaja	23	San José
Côte d'Ivoire	Yéo Jennifer	18	Aboisso
Croatia	Antonija Gogić	19	Zagreb
Curaçao	Gayle Sulvaran	19	Willemstad
Cyprus	Ioánna Filíppou	19	Nicosia
Czech Republic	Tereza Skoumalová	24	Ostrava
Denmark	Pernille Sørensen	23	Aalborg
Dominican Republic	Dhío Moreno	24	Santo Domingo
Ecuador	Virginia Limongi	19	Portoviejo
Egypt	Amina Ashraf	19	Giza
El Salvador	Larissa Vega	21	Santa Ana
England	Carina Tyrrell	24	Cambridge
Equatorial Guinea	Agnes Cheba	19	Luba
Ethiopia	Yirgalem Hadish	23	Addis Ababa
Fiji	Charlene Tafuna'i	20	Nadi
Finland	Krista Haapalainen	24	Helsinki
France	Flora Coquerel	20	Orléans
Gabon	Jessie Lekery	24	Moyen-Ogooué
Georgia	Ana Zubashvili	21	Tbilisi
Germany	Egzonita Ala	18	Stuttgart
Ghana	Nadia Ntanu	23	Accra
Gibraltar	Shyanne Azzopardi	23	Gibraltar
Greece	Eleni Kokkinou	20	Athens
Guadeloupe	Wendy Metony	20	Le Gosier
Guam	Chanel Cruz Jarrett	20	Agana Heights
Guatemala	Keyla Bermúdez	22	Guatemala City
Guinea	Halimatou Diallo	20	Conakry
Guyana	Rafieya Husain	21	Anna Regina
Haiti	Carolyn Desert	25	Port-au-Prince
Hong Kong	Erin Wong	23	Kowloon
Hungary	Edina Kulcsár	24	Budapest
Iceland	Tanja Ýr Ástþórsdóttir	22	Hafnarfjörður
India	Koyal Rana	21	New Delhi
Indonesia	Maria Rahajeng	22	Mamuju
Ireland	Jessica Hayes	20	Cork
Israel	Mor Maman	20	Beersheba
Italy	Silvia Cataldi	24	Sannicola
Jamaica	Laurie-Ann Chin	21	Montego Bay
Japan	Hikaru Kawai	19	Sendai
Kenya	Idah Nguma	22	Machakos
Kosovo	Vita Rexhepi	17	Pristina
Kyrgyzstan	Aikol Alikzhanova	24	Jalal-Abad
Latvia	Liliana Garkalne	19	Riga
Lebanon	Saly Greige	24	Bishmizzine
Lesotho	Nthole Matela	21	Mapoteng
Lithuania	Agnė Kavaliauskaitė	21	Vilnius
Luxembourg	Frédérique Wolff	19	Luxembourg
Malaysia	Dewi Liana Seriestha	25	Kampung Tematu
Malta	Joanna Galea	24	Valletta
Martinique	Anaïs Delwaulle	20	Fort-de-France
Mauritius	Sheetal Khadun	25	Port Louis
Mexico	Daniela Álvarez	21	Cuernavaca
Moldova	Alexandra Caruntu	18	Ungheni
Mongolia	Battsetseg Turbat	23	Ulaanbaatar
Montenegro	Nataša Novaković	18	Podgorica
Myanmar	Wyne Lay	19	Naypyidaw
Namibia	Brumhilda Ochs	22	Windhoek
Nepal	Subin Limbu	23	Dharan
Netherlands	Tatjana Maul	25	The Hague
New Zealand	Arielle Garciano	22	Lyttelton
Nicaragua	Yumara López	20	Rivas
Nigeria	Iheoma Nnadi	19	Akwa Ibom
Northern Ireland	Rebekah Shirley	19	Belfast
Norway	Monica Pedersen	25	Moelv
Panama	Nicole Pinto	21	Panama City
Paraguay	Myriam Arévalos	21	Asunción
Peru	Sofía Rivera	24	Oxapampa
Philippines	Valerie Weigmann	25	Legazpi
Poland	Ada Sztajerowska	22	Piotrków Trybunalski
Portugal	Zita Oliveira	24	Lisbon
Puerto Rico	Génesis Dávila	24	Arroyo
Romania	Bianca Fanu	25	Timișoara
Russia	Anastasia Kostenko	20	Salsk
São Tomé and Príncipe	Djeissica Barbosa	19	São Tomé
Scotland	Ellie McKeating	19	Milngavie
Serbia	Milica Vukliš	21	Belgrade
Seychelles	Camila Estico	23	Victoria
Singapore	Dalreena Poonam Gill	20	Bedok
Slovakia	Laura Longauerová	19	Detva
Slovenia	Julija Bizjak	20	Lesce
South Africa	Rolene Strauss	22	Volksrust
South Korea (Note: Competed as Korea in the pageant)	Hwa-young Song	23	Suwon
South Sudan	Awien Kuanyin-Agoth	19	Gogrial
Spain	Lourdes Rodríguez	20	Daimiel
Sri Lanka	Chulakshi Ranathunga	25	Colombo
Sweden	Olivia Asplund	18	Stockholm
Switzerland	Dijana Cvijetić	20	Gossau
Tanzania	Happiness Watimanywa	20	Dodoma
Thailand	Nonthawan Thongleng	20	Surat Thani
Trinidad and Tobago	Sarah Jane Waddell	24	Carenage
Tunisia	Wahiba Arres	20	Menzel Bourguiba
Turkey	Amine Gülşe	21	İzmir
Uganda	Leah Kalanguka	21	Iganga
Ukraine	Andriana Khasanshin	19	Lviv
United States	Elizabeth Safrit	22	Kannapolis
United States Virgin Islands	Aniska Tonge	20	Saint Thomas
Uruguay	Romina Fernández	20	Montevideo
Venezuela	Debora Menicucci	23	Caracas
Vietnam	Nguyễn Thị Loan	23	Ho Chi Minh City
Wales	Alice Ford	21	Cardiff
Zimbabwe	Tendai Humda	23	Chitungwiza
