= Iveta Lutovská =

Czech model

Iveta Vítová
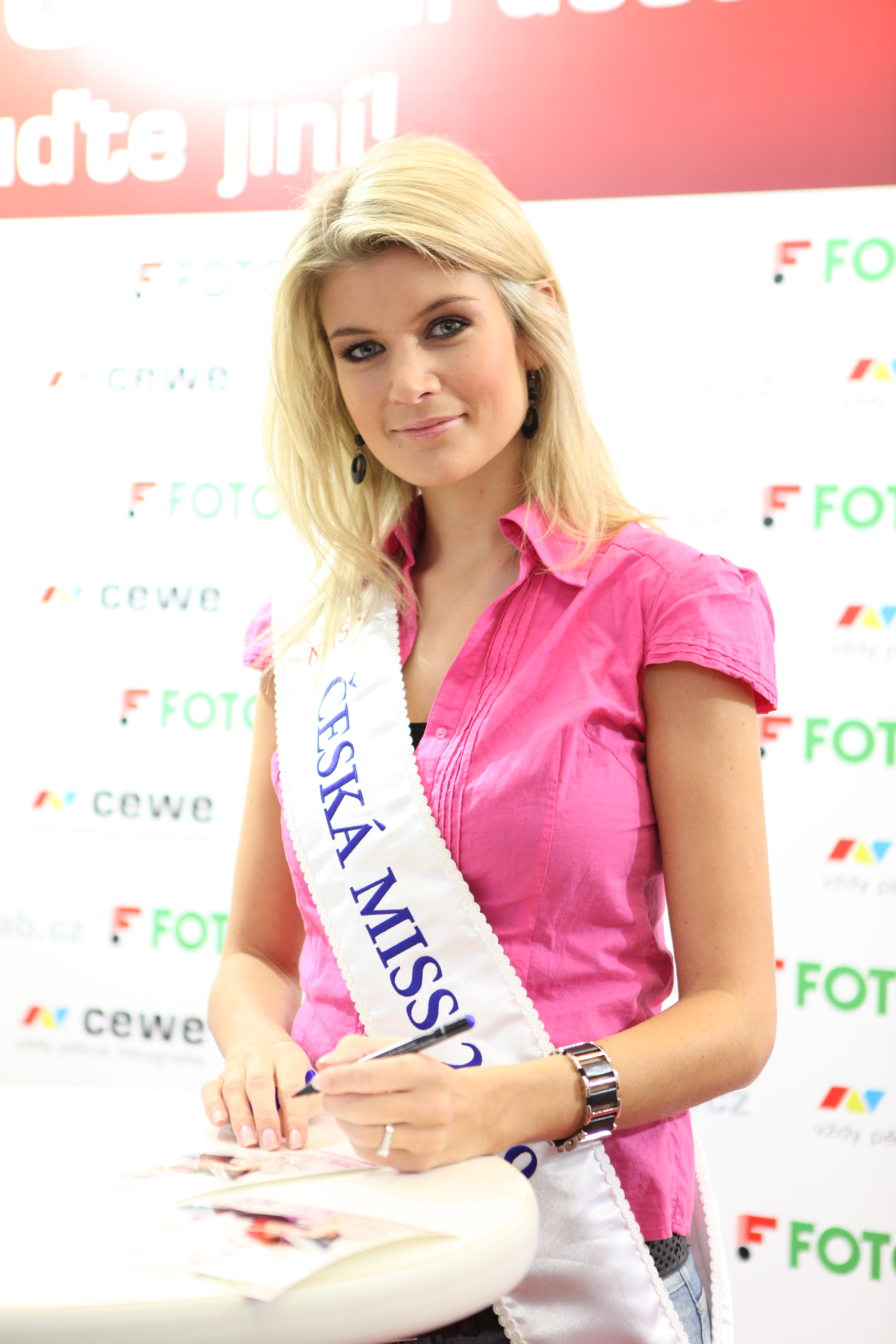
- Lutovská in 2009
- Born: Iveta Lutovská; 14 May 1983 (age 43); Jindřichův Hradec, Czechoslovakia
- Height: 1.83 m (6 ft 0 in)
- Spouse: Jaroslav Vít (m. 2011–2024)
- Beauty pageant titleholder
- Title: Czech Miss 2009; Miss Model of the World 2007
- Hair color: Blond
- Eye color: Green
- Major competitions: Czech Miss 2009 (Winner); Miss Model of the World 2007 (Winner); Miss Universe 2009 (Top 10)

Iveta Vítová Lutovská, formerly Vítová, née Lutovská (born 14 May 1983) is a Czech TV host, model and beauty pageant titleholder who won Czech Miss 2009 and placed in the top 10 at Miss Universe 2009.

== Pageantry ==
Lutovská previously held the title of Miss Model of the World 2007 and most recently was crowned Czech Miss 2009. She represented the Czech Republic at the Miss Universe 2009 pageant on 23 August 2009 in Nassau, Bahamas, where she continued Czech Republic's stake in the Miss Universe pageant by placing in the semifinals for a consecutive third time finishing as a Top 10 finalist, finishing 8th overall.

== Personal life ==
Lutovská was born on born 14 May 1983 in Jindřichův Hradec, but she is native of Třeboň. She married businessman Jaroslav Vít in a ceremony in September 2011, taking the name Vítová. They got divorced in July 2024. They have a daughter and son together.

Awards and achievements
Preceded by Eliška Bučková	Czech Miss; 2009	Succeeded by Jitka Válková
Preceded by (China) May Di Song	Miss Model of the World; 2007	Succeeded by (Ukraine) Mariya Lakimuk
