= Veronika Machová =

Czech model and fashion designer (born 1990)

- Born: Veronika Machová; 17 August 1990 (age 36); Rokycany, Czechoslovakia
- Height: 5 ft 10 in (1.78 m)
- Spouse: Roman Červenka (m. 2015)
- Children: 1
- Beauty pageant titleholder
- Title: Czech Miss World 2010
- Hair color: Blond
- Eye color: Blue
- Major competition: Miss World 2010 (Unplaced)

Veronika Machová (born 17 August 1990) is a Czech model and beauty pageant titleholder who won Miss World Czech Republic 2010 on Saturday 20 March 2010. She is studied Pedagogical Faculty, Charles University in Prague.

Machová competed in Miss World 2010 in China.

== Personal life ==
On 22 December 2012 she gave birth to a son Denis. On 20 June 2015 she married his father, Ice hockey player Roman Červenka.
