= Cablotales =

Locality in Honduras

Cablotales is a locality in Honduras near Santa Barbara.

On 19 November 2014 María José Alvarado who was about to participate in Miss World 2014 was found dead in Cablotales, alongside her sister. The sisters boyfriend was a drunk responsible for killing her at a party.
