= Vanesa Švédová =

Czech model

- Born: 27 August 2003 (age 23); Přerov, Czech Republic
- Occupation: Model
- Height: 1.79 m (5 ft 10 1/2 in)
- Beauty pageant titleholder
- Title: Czech Miss 2023
- Major competitions: Czech Miss 2023 (Winner); Miss Universe 2023 (Unplaced)

Vanesa Švédová (born 27 August 2003) is a Czech model and beauty pageant titleholder who was crowned Czech Miss 2023, she represented her country at Miss Universe 2023.

== Pageantry ==
=== Česká Miss Essens 2022 ===
In December 2022, Švédová won the title of Česká Miss Essens 2022 against 11 other finalists in Prague, Czech Republic.

=== Miss Universe 2023 ===
Švédová represented the Czech Republic at the 72nd Miss Universe competition held in El Salvador on 18 November 2023 but unplaced.

Awards and achievements
Preceded by Sára Mikulenková	Czech Miss; 2023	Succeeded by Marie Danči
