= Miss Universe Czech Republic =

National beauty pageant competition in the Czech Republic

- Miss Universe Česko (Miss Universe Czechia)
- Formation: 2005; 21 years ago
- Type: Beauty pageant
- Headquarters: Brno
- Location: Czech Republic
- Members: Miss Universe
- Official language: Czech
- President: Michal Kovář
- Website: www.missuniverse.sk

Miss Universe Czech Republic, officially known as Miss Universe Česko (Miss Universe Czechia), and previously referred to as Česká Miss Universe (Czech Miss Universe), is a national beauty pageant and organization in the Czech Republic. Founded in 2005, the winner of the pageant represents the country at the international competition of Miss Universe.

== History ==
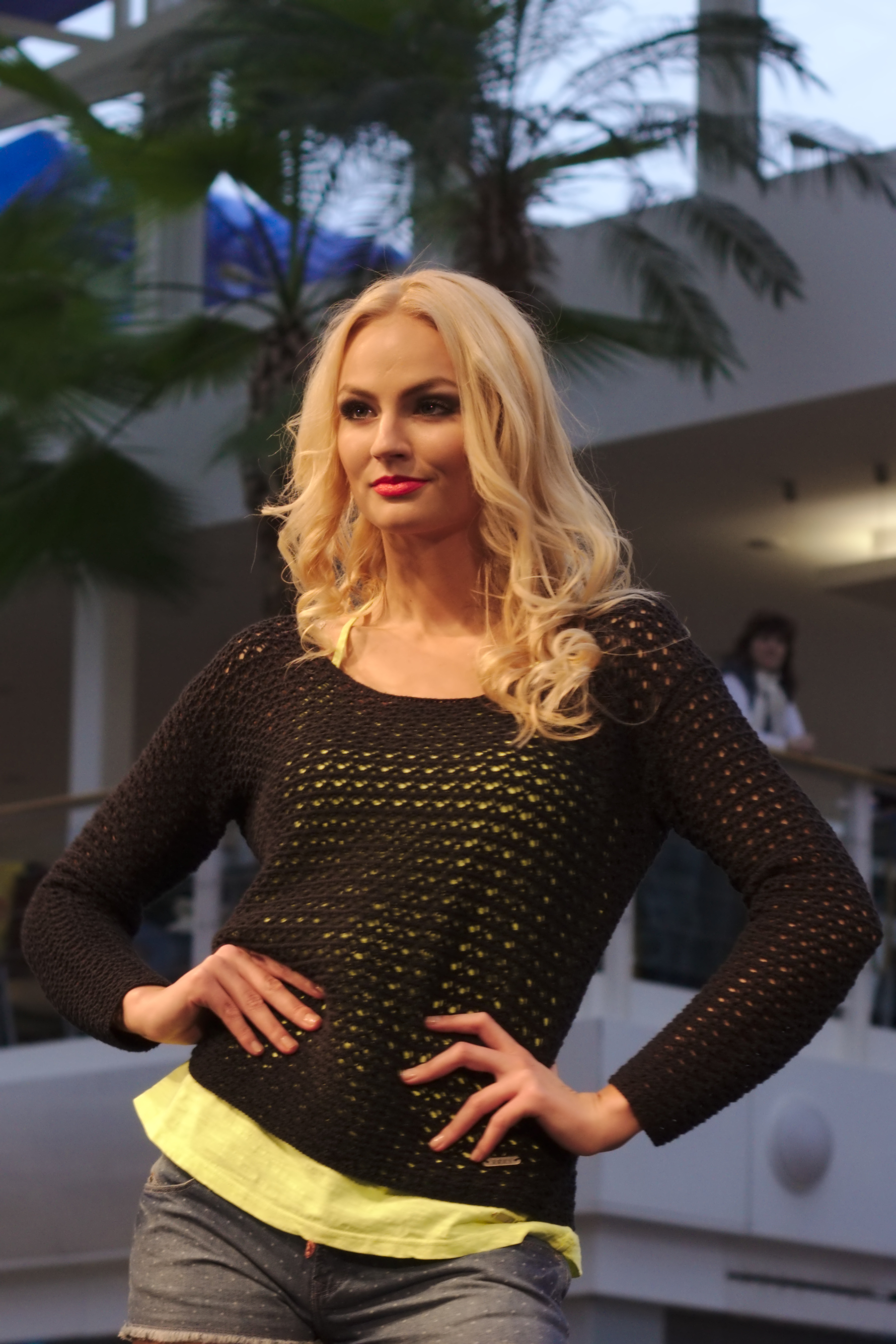
Miss Earth 2012 Tereza Fajksová

The Czech Miss was established in 2005 and is organized and produced by Michaela Maláčová, Miss Czechoslovakia 1991 and director of Miss Marketing s.r.o. From 2005 to 2009, the pageant selected a winner to represent the country in Miss Universe, and a first runner up participated in the Miss Earth pageant. In 2010, Czech Miss and its rival pageant, Miss Czech Republic (Czech: Miss České republiky) merged under the direction of Maláčová, and two winners were selected. The winner of Czech Miss 2010 competed in Miss Universe 2010 and Czech Miss World 2010 vied in Miss World 2010, while the first runner up competed in Miss Earth 2010 pageant.

Since 2011 the pageant has selected three winners: Czech Miss, Czech Miss World, and Czech Miss Earth to compete in Miss Universe, Miss World, and Miss Earth respectively. In 2015 Marcela Krplová became co-owner. After that previous runner up of Miss Czech Republic Ivana Kubelková became patron. In 2016 company was taken over by Martin Ditmar and Eva Čerešňáková. Since 2016 Ceska miss lost the license of Miss World to Miss Czech Republic. In 2018 Čerešňáková sold her part in company to Miss Events a.s. and Juliette Armand.

In 2012, Czech Miss pageant produced an international winner for the first time when Tereza Fajksová won Miss Earth 2012 in the Miss Earth pageant.

Since 2025, Czech Miss change their competition name to Miss Universe Czechia.

== International crowns ==
- One – Miss Earth winner: Tereza Fajksová (2012)
- One – Miss Global winner: Karolína Kokešová (2019)

== Titleholders ==
Year	Česká Miss	First Runner-Up	Second Runner-Up
2005	Kateřina Smejkalová; Olomouc	Zuzana Štěpanovská; Jihlava	Michaela Štoudková; Chomutov
2006	Renata Langmannová; Ivanovice na Hané	Miroslava Košťanová; Prague	Barbora Kolářová; Prague
2007	Lucie Hadašová; Strážnice	Eva Čerešňáková; Prague	Lilian Sarah Fischerová; Plzeň
2008	Eliška Bučková; Strážnice	Hana Svobodová; Zadní Zhořec	Elisavet Charalambidu; Brno
2009	Iveta Lutovská; Jindřichův Hradec	Tereza Budková; Tábor	Zina Šťovíčková; Nový Bor
2010	Jitka Válková; Jihlava	Veronika Machová; Rokycany	Carmen Justová; Sokolov
Year	Česká Miss	Česká Miss World	Česká Miss Earth
2011	Jitka Nováčková; České Budějovice	Denisa Domanská; Kyjov	Šárka Cojocarová; Bruntál
2012	Tereza Chlebovská; Třemošná	Linda Bartošová; Vysoké Mýto	Tereza Fajksová; Ivančice
2013	Gabriela Kratochvílová; Chotěboř	Lucie Kovandová; Dolní Kounice	Monika Leová; Choceň
2014	Gabriela Franková; Brno	Tereza Skoumalová; Ostrava	Nikola Buranská; Přerov
2015	Nikol Švantnerová; Olomouc	Andrea Kalousová; Hradec Králové	Karolína Mališová; Otice
2016	Andrea Bezděková; Hradec Králové	Natálie Kotková; Ústí nad Labem	Kristýna Kubíčková; Ostrava
Year	Česká Miss	Česká Miss Earth	Česká Miss Supranational
2017	Michaela Habáňová; Prague	Iva Uchytilová; Pardubice	Tereza Vlčková; Zlín
2018	Lea Šteflíčková; Ústí nad Labem	Tereza Křivánková; Prague	Jana Šišková; Zlín
Year	Česká Miss	Miss Česko-Slovenské	Runner-up
2019	Barbora Hodačová; Ústí nad Labem	Klára Vavrušková; Kostelec nad Orlicí	Karolína Kokešová; Prague
Year	Česká Miss	First Runner-up	Second Runner-up
2022	Vanesa Švédová; Olomouc	Kristýna Pavlovičová; South Bohemian	Marie Danči; Moravian-Silesian
Year	Miss Universe Česko	First Runner-up	Second Runner-up
2025	Michaela Tomanová; Prague	—N/a	—N/a
2026	Sophia Osako; Moravia	—N/a	—N/a

== International placements ==
=== Current franchise ===
==== Miss Universe Česko ====
- : Declared as Winner
- : Ended as runner-up or top 5/6 qualification
- : Ended as one of the finalists or semifinalists
- : Ended as special awards winner

Since 2025, the Czech Republic competes at Miss Universe under the Miss Universe Česko organization, which is headed by national director Sam Dolce.

Year	Region	Miss Universe Česko	Placement at Miss Universe	Special awards	Notes
2026	Prague	Dominika Kotoučková	TBA	TBA	
2026	Moravia	Sophia Osako	Withdrew		
2025	Prague	Michaela Tomanová	Unplaced		She became the first mother to win Miss Universe Czech Republic title.

==== Česká Miss Universe ====
- : Declared as Winner
- : Ended as runner-up or top 5/6 qualification
- : Ended as one of the finalists or semifinalists
- : Ended as special awards winner

From 2005 to 2024, the Czech Republic competed at Miss Universe under the Česká Miss Universe organization, which was established by Michaela Maláčová. From 1993 to 2004, the Czech Republic competed at Miss Universe under the Miss České republiky organization.

Year	Region	Česká Miss Universe	Placement at Miss Universe	Special awards	Notes
2024	Moravia-Silesia	Marie Danči	Unplaced		Appointed ― No pageant in 2024 and Marie was designated by Ceska Miss Organization. She was the second runner-up of 2022 edition.
2023	Olomouc	Vanesa Švédová	Unplaced		
2022	Zlín	Sára Mikulenková	Unplaced		Appointed — Due to date schedule management, Ceska Miss 2022 winner allocated to Miss Universe 2023. At this moment, Sára from Top 20 Ceska Miss 2022 designated to be Miss Universe Czech Republic 2022.
2021	Prague	Karolína Kokešová	Unplaced		Appointed — Due to the impact of COVID-19 pandemic, the Česká Miss Global 2019 crowned as the Miss Universe Czech Republic 2021.
2020	Hradec Králové	Klára Vavrušková	Unplaced		Appointed — Due to the impact of COVID-19 pandemic, the Miss Česko-Slovenské 2019 crowned as the Miss Universe Czech Republic 2020.
2019	Ústí nad Labem	Barbora Hodačová	Unplaced		Miss Česko-Slovenské (Miss Universe Slovenskej Republiky and Česká Miss held together on one final gala.
2018	Ústí nad Labem	Lea Šteflíčková	Unplaced		
2017	Zlín	Michaela Habáňová	Unplaced		
2016	Hradec Králové	Andrea Bezděková	Unplaced		
2015	South Bohemia	Nikol Švantnerová	Unplaced		
2014	South Moravia	Gabriela Franková	Unplaced		
2013	Vysočina	Gabriela Kratochvílová	Unplaced		The first short hairstyle winner.
2012	Moravia-Silesia	Tereza Chlebovská	Unplaced		
2011	South Bohemia	Jitka Nováčková	Unplaced		
2010	Vysočina	Jitka Válková	Top 15		
2009	South Bohemia	Iveta Lutovská	Top 10		
2008	South Moravia	Eliška Bučková	Top 15		
2007	Prague	Lucie Hadašová	Top 15		
2006	Prague	Renata Langmannová	Unplaced		
2005	Prague	Kateřina Smejkalová	Unplaced	Best National Costume (1st Runner-up)	

=== Past franchise ===
==== Česká Miss Earth ====
- : Declared as Winner
- : Ended as runner-up
- : Ended as one of the finalists or semifinalists
- : Ended as special awards winner

The Czech Republic was first represented in Miss Earth in 2002 by Apolena Tůmová who was chosen by another organization. The Czech Republic was not represented in Miss Earth in 2001, 2003 and 2004. From 2005 to 2009, after Michaela Maláčová established Czech Miss, the runner-up of the pageant competed at the Miss Earth pageant. Since 2010, Czech Miss has selected three national winners, where the third winner is awarded the title of Czech Miss Earth and goes on to represent the Czech Republic in the Miss Earth pageant.

Year	Region	Česká Miss Earth	Placement at Miss Earth	Special awards	Notes
Did not extend the Miss Earth license since 2025―present
2024	Did not compete				
2023	South Bohemian	Kristýna Pavlovičová	Unplaced		
2022	Vysočina	Anezka Heralecká	Top 20		Appointed — Due to date schedule management, Runner-up Ceska Miss 2022 winner allocated to Miss Earth 2023. At this moment, Anezka from Top 20 Ceska Miss 2022 was designated or appointed to be Miss Earth Czech Republic 2022. After competing at Miss Earth 2022 on Nov 29th, Anezka went ahead and joined the rest of the delegates during the finals of Czech Miss Essens on Dec 11th, even though she already had the opportunity of representing Czech Republic at Miss Earth 2022, placing in the Top 20.
2021	Prague	Adéla Štroffeková	Top 20	(gold) Talent (Creative)	The 2nd edition of Miss Earth ― Online version
2020	Did not compete due to the impact of COVID-19 pandemic				
2019	Hradec Králové	Klára Vavrušková	Miss Water (2nd Runner-Up)	(bronze) Swimsuit (Air); (silver) National Costume (Europe)	Miss Česko-Slovenské (Miss Universe Slovenskej Republiky and Česká Miss held together on one final gala) — Miss Česko-Slovenské 2019.
2018	Prague	Tereza Křivánková	Unplaced		
2017	Pardubice	Iva Uchytilová	Top 8		
2016	Moravia-Silesia	Kristýna Kubíčková	Unplaced	(silver) Talent (Group 3)	
2015	Moravia-Silesia	Karolína Mališová	Top 16	(gold) Snowman Building	
2014	Olomouc	Nikola Buranská	Unplaced	Miss Placenta	
2013	Pardubice	Monika Leová	Unplaced		
2012	South Moravia	Tereza Fajksová	Miss Earth 2012	Miss Kaolin Sea; (silver) Painting Challenge; (silver) Resort Wear; (silver) Evening Gown; (bronze) Miss Friendship	
2011	Moravia-Silesia	Šárka Cojocarová	Unplaced	Best in Swimsuit	
2010	Karlovy Vary	Carmen Justová	Top 14	Best in Evening Gown (Top 5)	
2009	South Bohemia	Tereza Budková	Unplaced	Miss Photogenic; Best in Eco-Bag Design Wear	
2008	Vysočina	Hana Svobodová	Top 16		
2007	Prague	Eva Čerešňáková	Top 16		
2006	Prague	Petra Soukupová	Top 8		
2005	Vysočina	Zuzana Štěpanovská	Top 16		

=== Česká Miss World ===
- : Declared as Winner
- : Ended as runner-up or top 5/6 qualification
- : Ended as one of the finalists or semifinalists
- : Ended as special awards winner

From 1993 to 2009, the Czech Republic competed at Miss World through the Miss České republiky organization. However, in 2010, after the pageant went bankrupt, Michaela Maláčová took over the Miss World franchise in the Czech Republic. The second placed of the Česká Miss was assigned to Miss World. In 2016 due to police investigation of previous owner Marcela Krplová, Miss World decided to stopped down cooperation with Czech Miss.

Year	Region	Česká Miss World	Placement at Miss World	Special awards	Notes
Did not extend the Miss World license since 2017―present
2016	Prague	Natalie Kotková	Unplaced	Miss World Talent (Top 21); Miss World Sport (Top 24)	
2015	Pardubice	Andrea Kalousová	Unplaced		
2014	Moravia-Silesia	Tereza Skoumalová	Unplaced	Miss World Top Model (Top 20); Miss World Sports (Top 32)	
2013	South Moravia	Lucie Kovandová	Unplaced	Miss World Beach Beauty (Top 34)	
2012	Pardubice	Linda Bartošová	Unplaced	Miss World Beach Beauty (Top 10); Miss World Talent (Top 25)	
2011	South Moravia	Denisa Domanská	Unplaced	Miss World Talent (Top 20)	
2010	Plzeň	Veronika Machová	Unplaced	Miss World Beach Beauty (Top 20)	

== Galleries ==
Winners Gallery

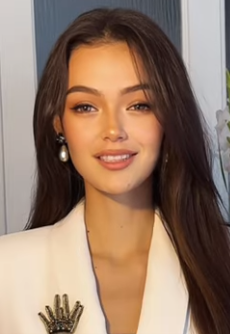
Miss Universe Česko 2026,
Sophia Osako,
South Moravian Region

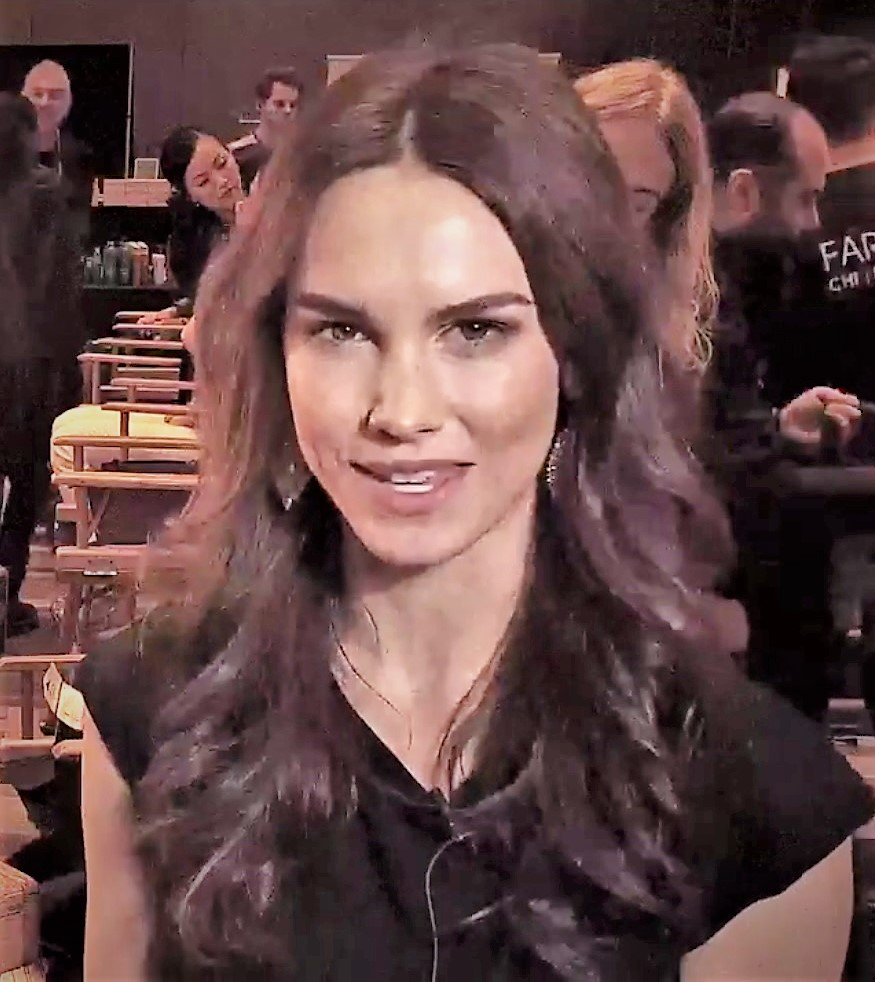
Česká Miss 2019,
Barbora Hodačová,
Ústí nad Labem

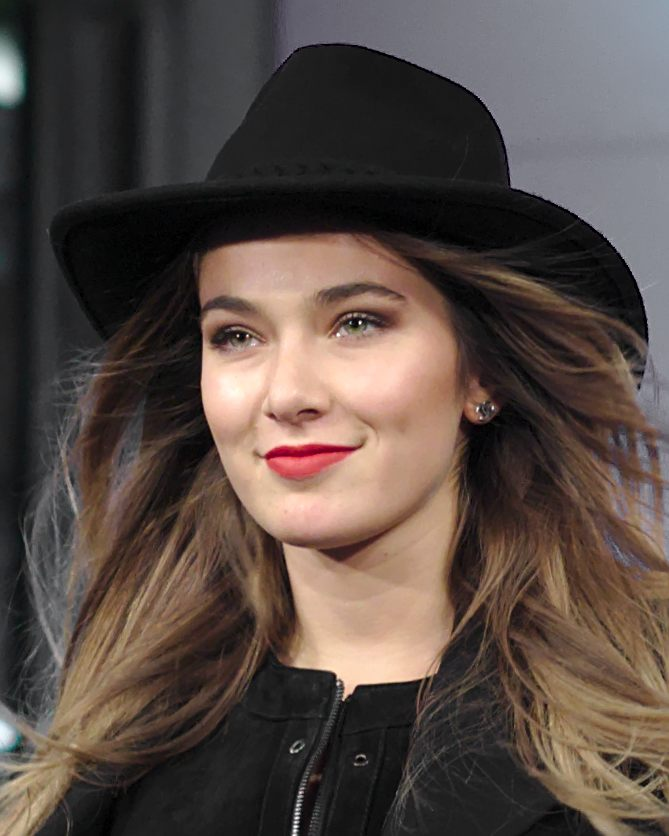
Česká Miss 2016,
Andrea Bezděková,
Hradec Králové

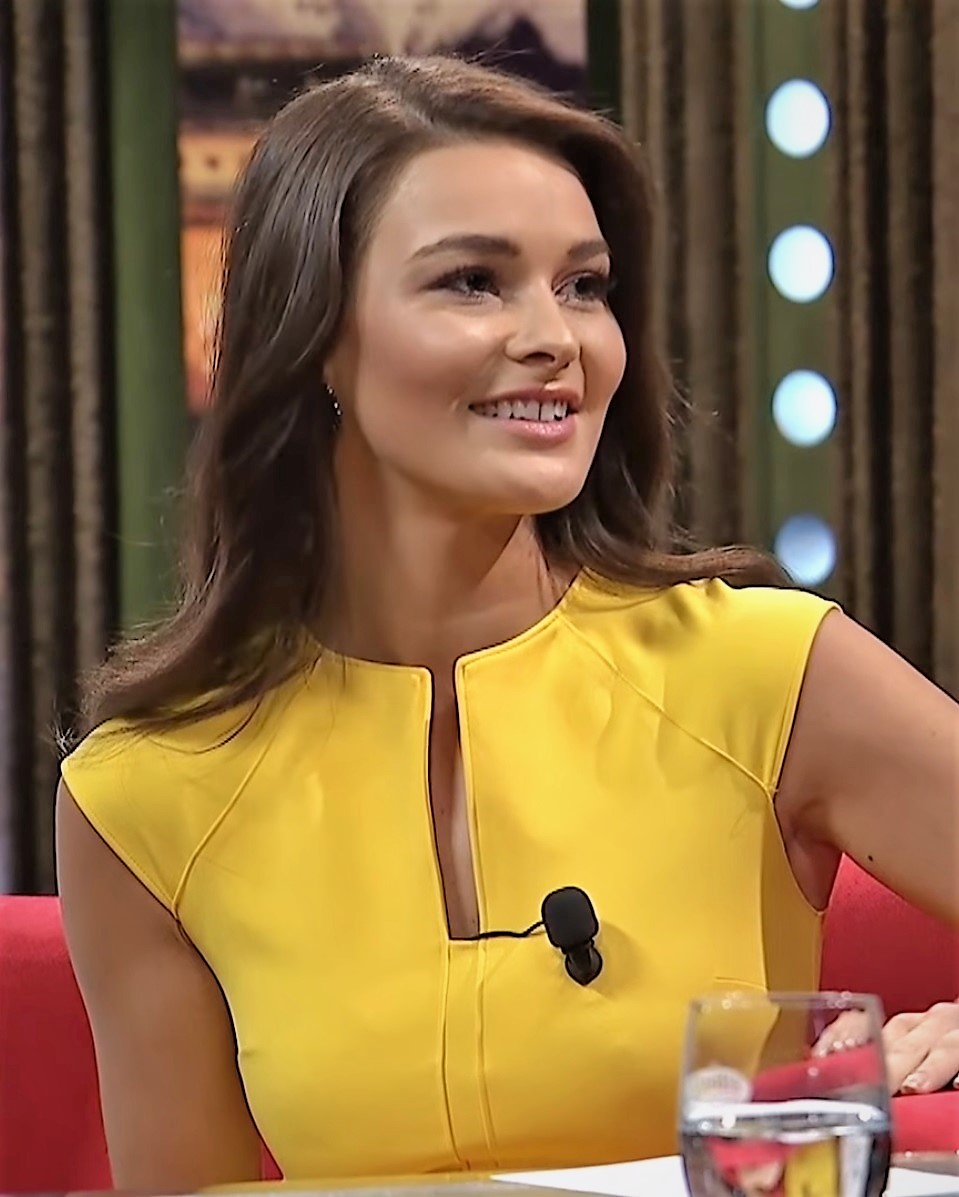
Česká Miss 2015,
Nikol Švantnerová,
South Bohemian Region

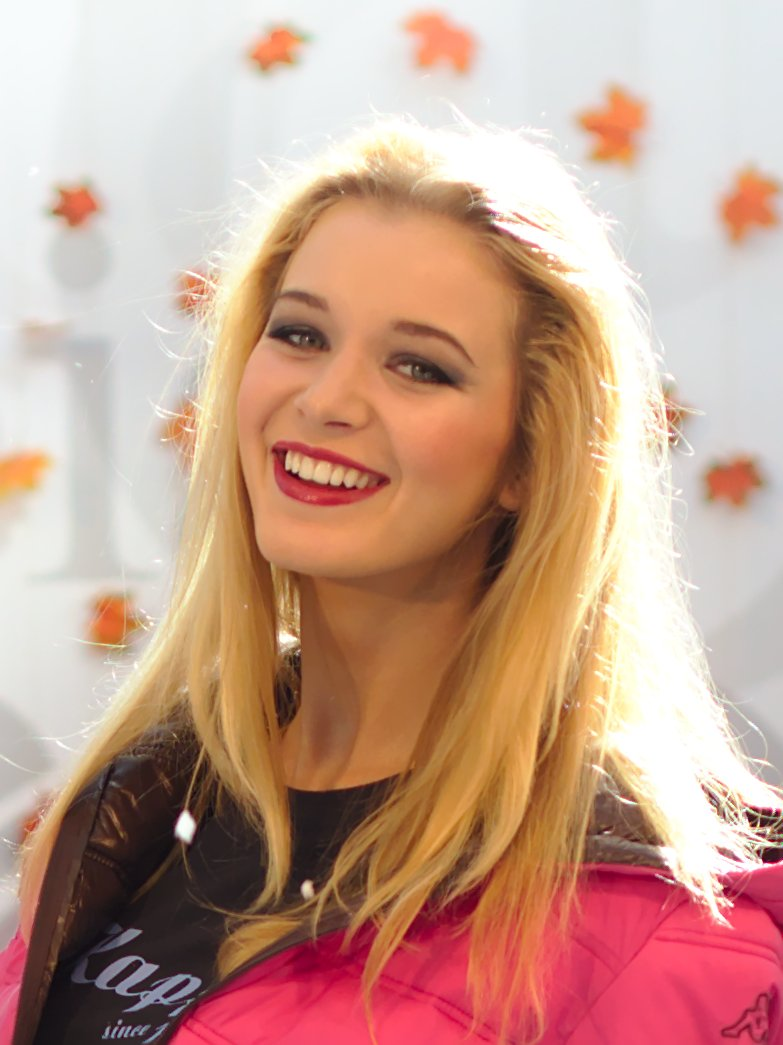
Česká Miss 2014,
Gabriela Franková,
South Moravian Region

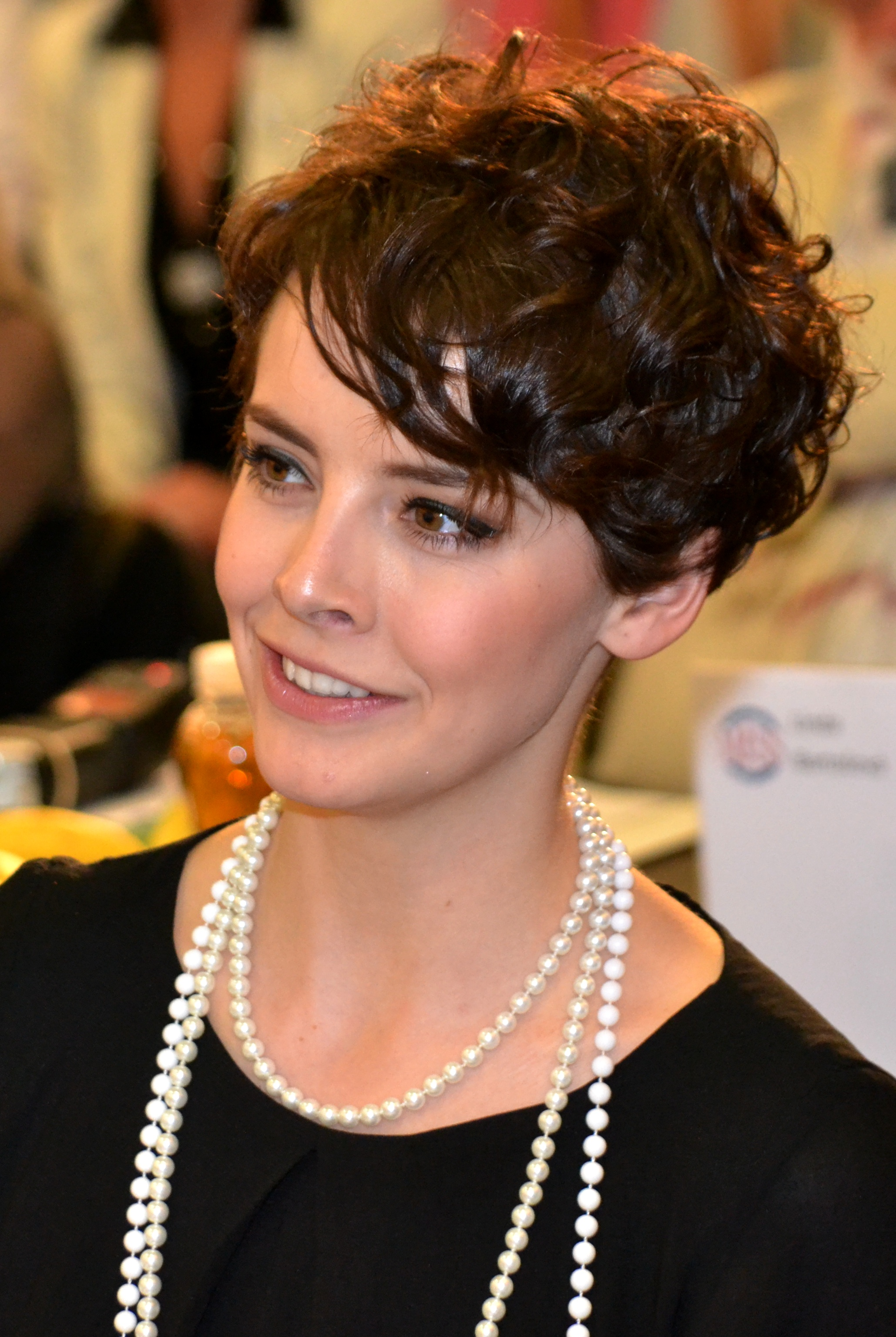
Česká Miss 2013,
Gabriela Kratochvílová,
Vysočina

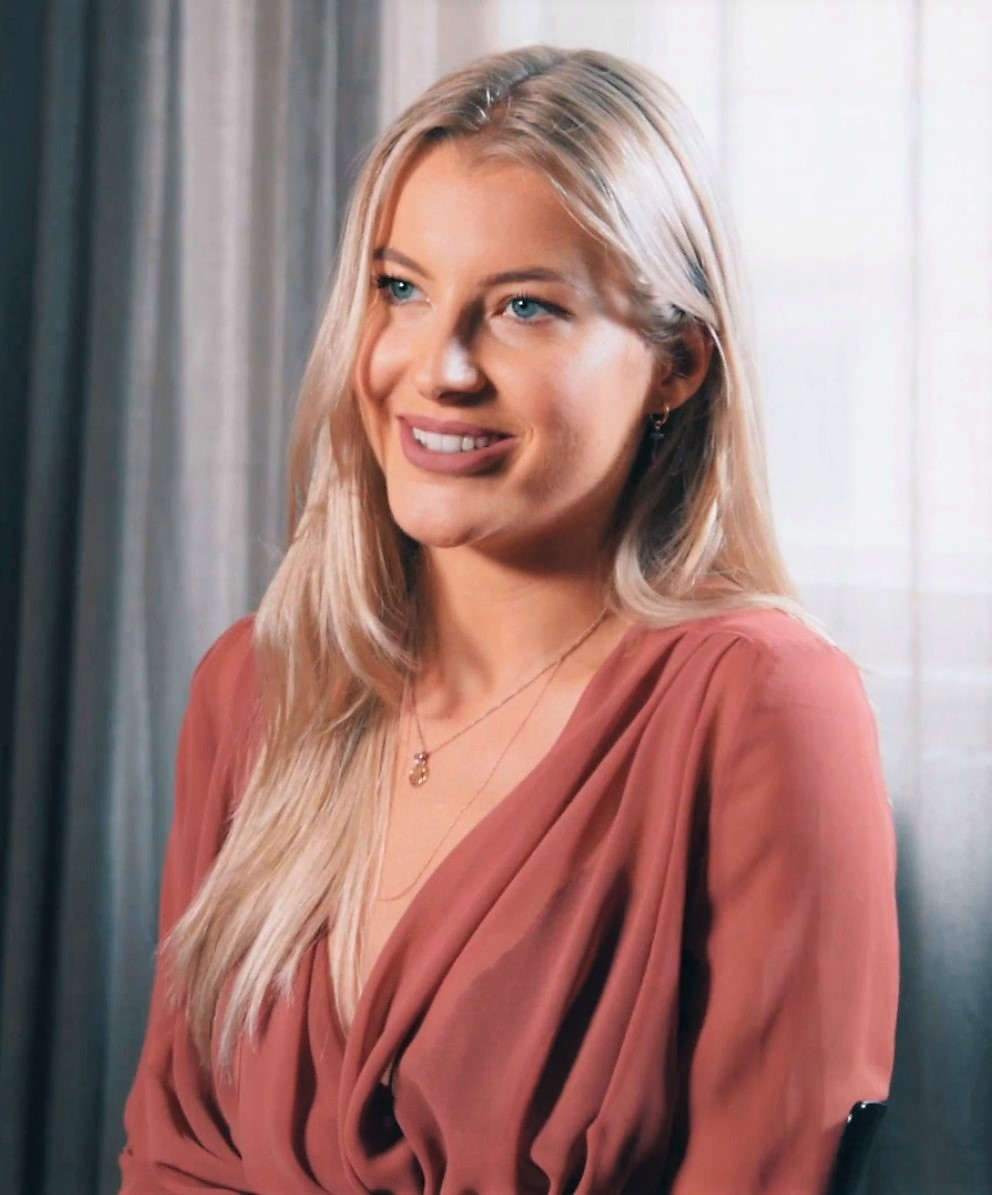
Česká Miss 2011,
Jitka Nováčková,
South Bohemian Region

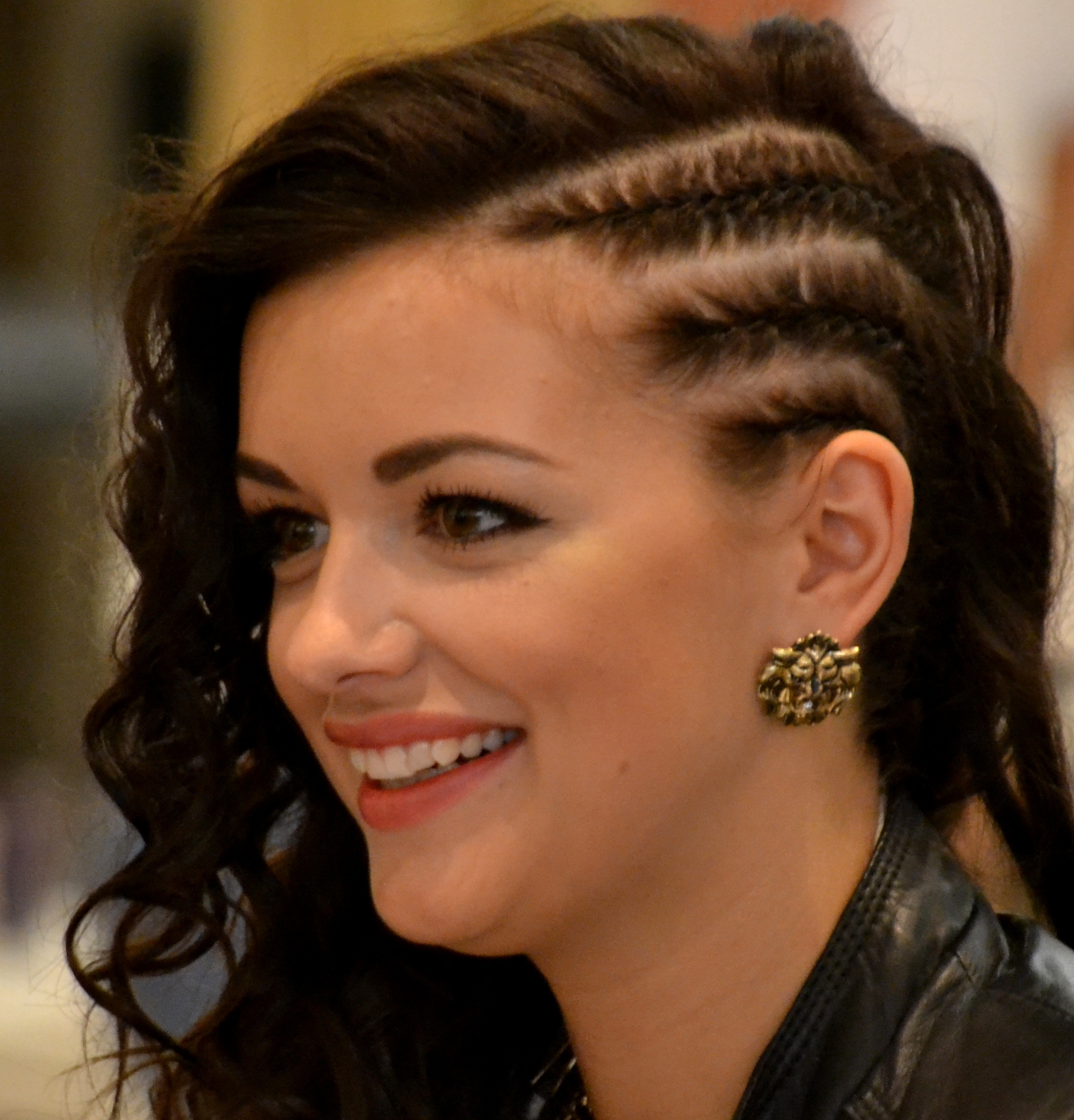
Česká Miss 2010,
Jitka Válková,
Vysočina

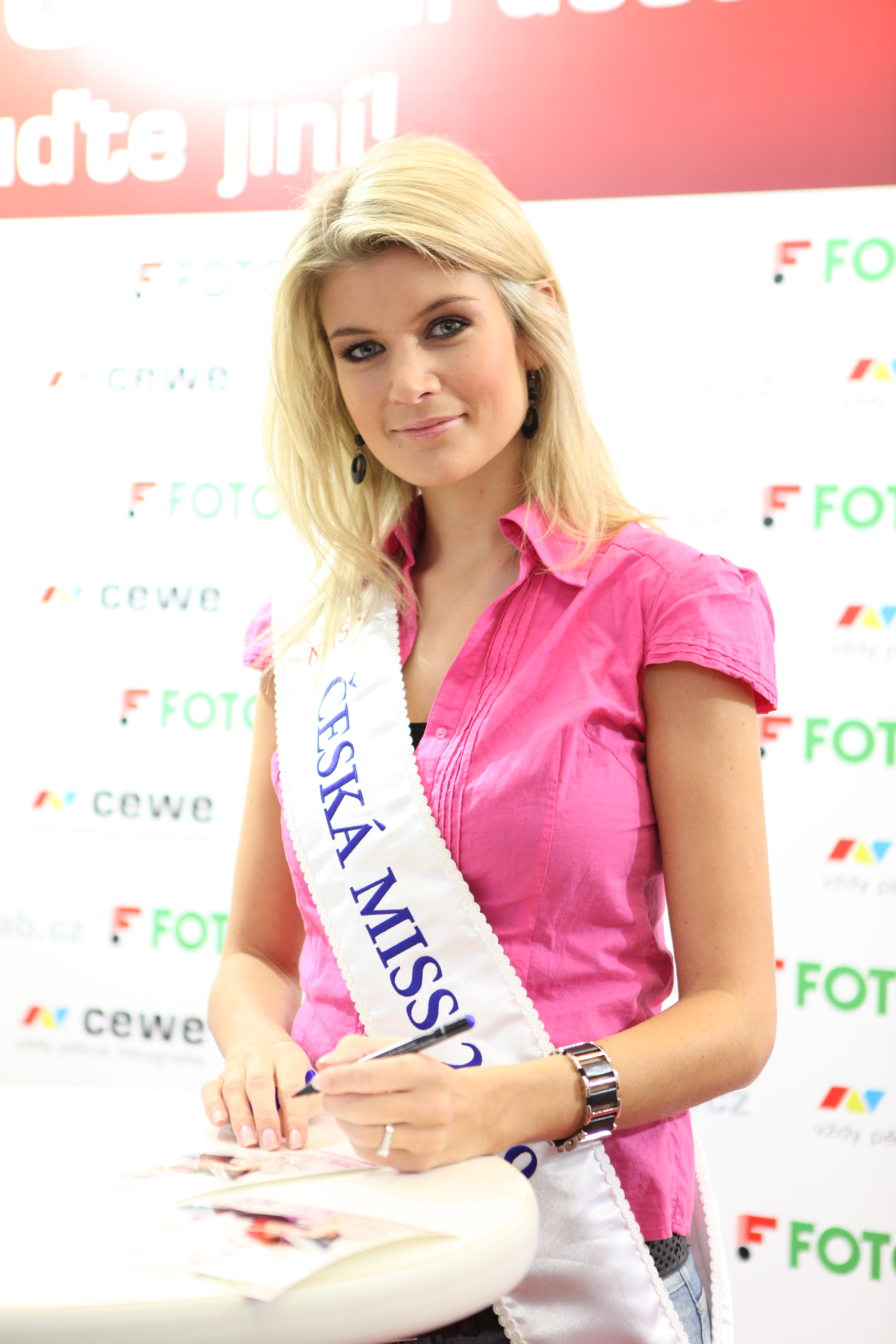
Česká Miss 2009,
Iveta Lutovská,
South Bohemian Region

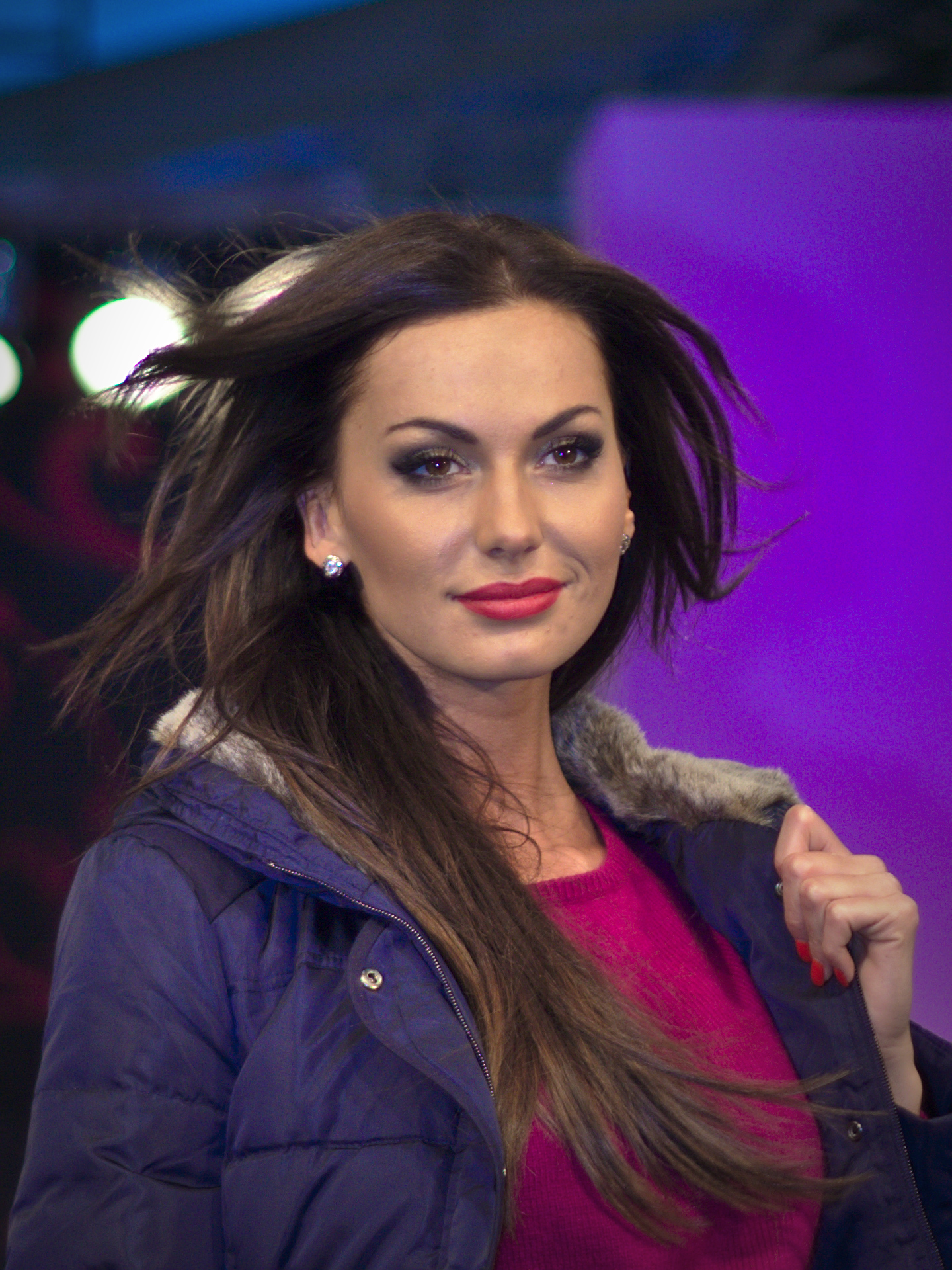
Česká Miss 2008,
Eliška Bučková,
South Moravian Region

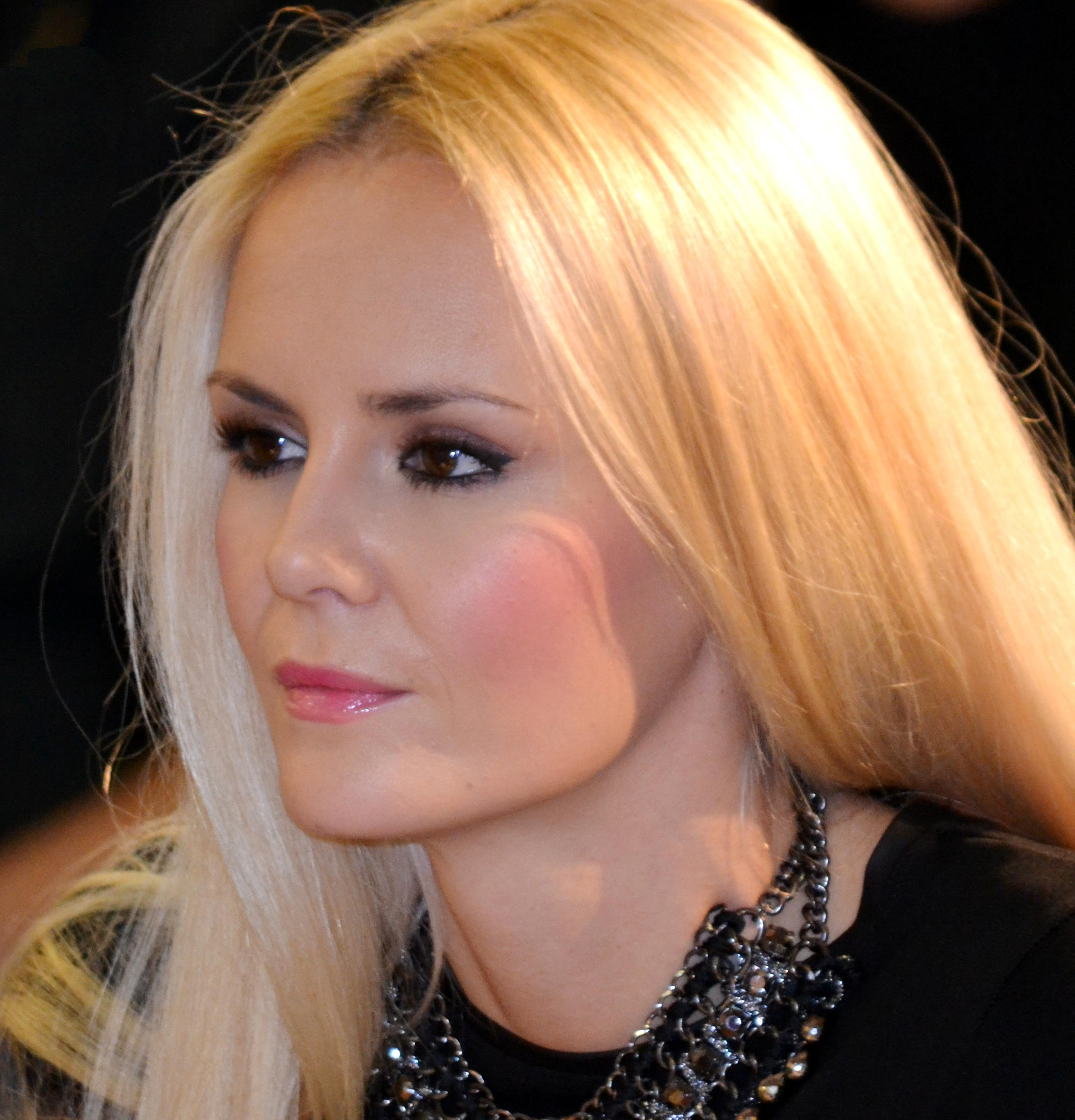
Česká Miss 2007,
Lucie Hadašová,
Prague
Winners Gallery ― Miss Earth Czech Republic

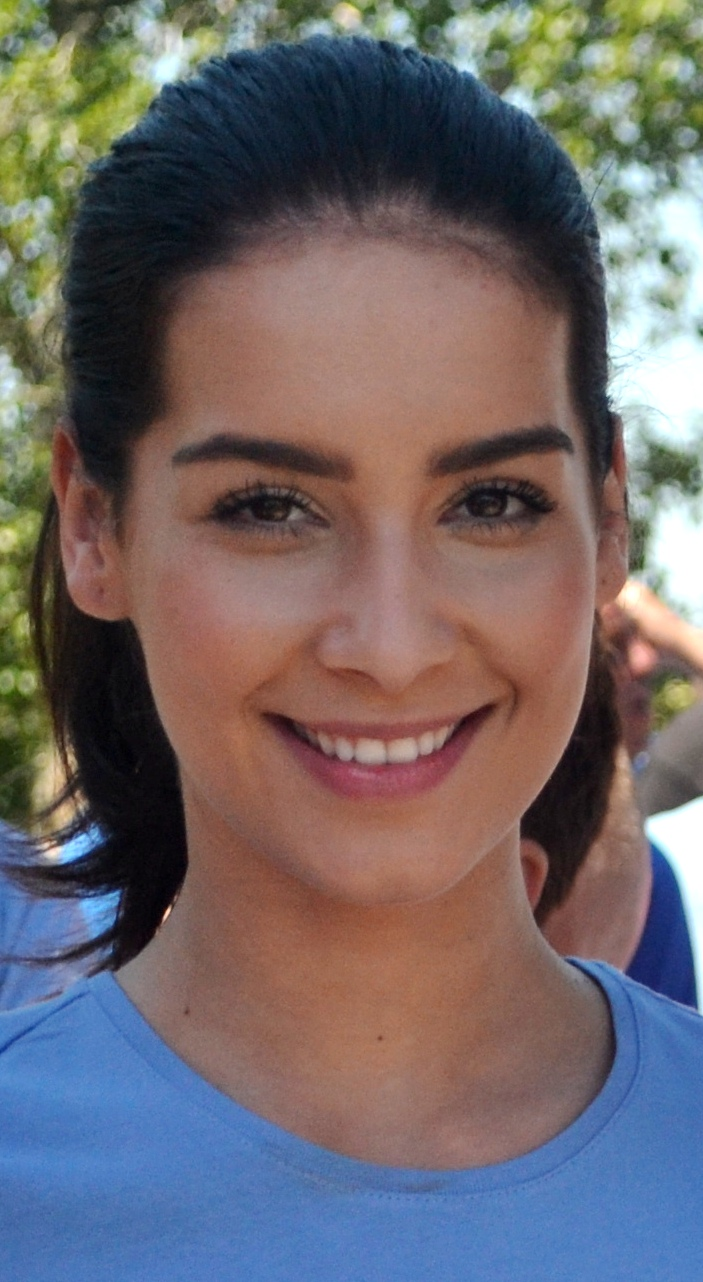
Česká Miss Earth 2014
Nikola Buranská,
Olomouc

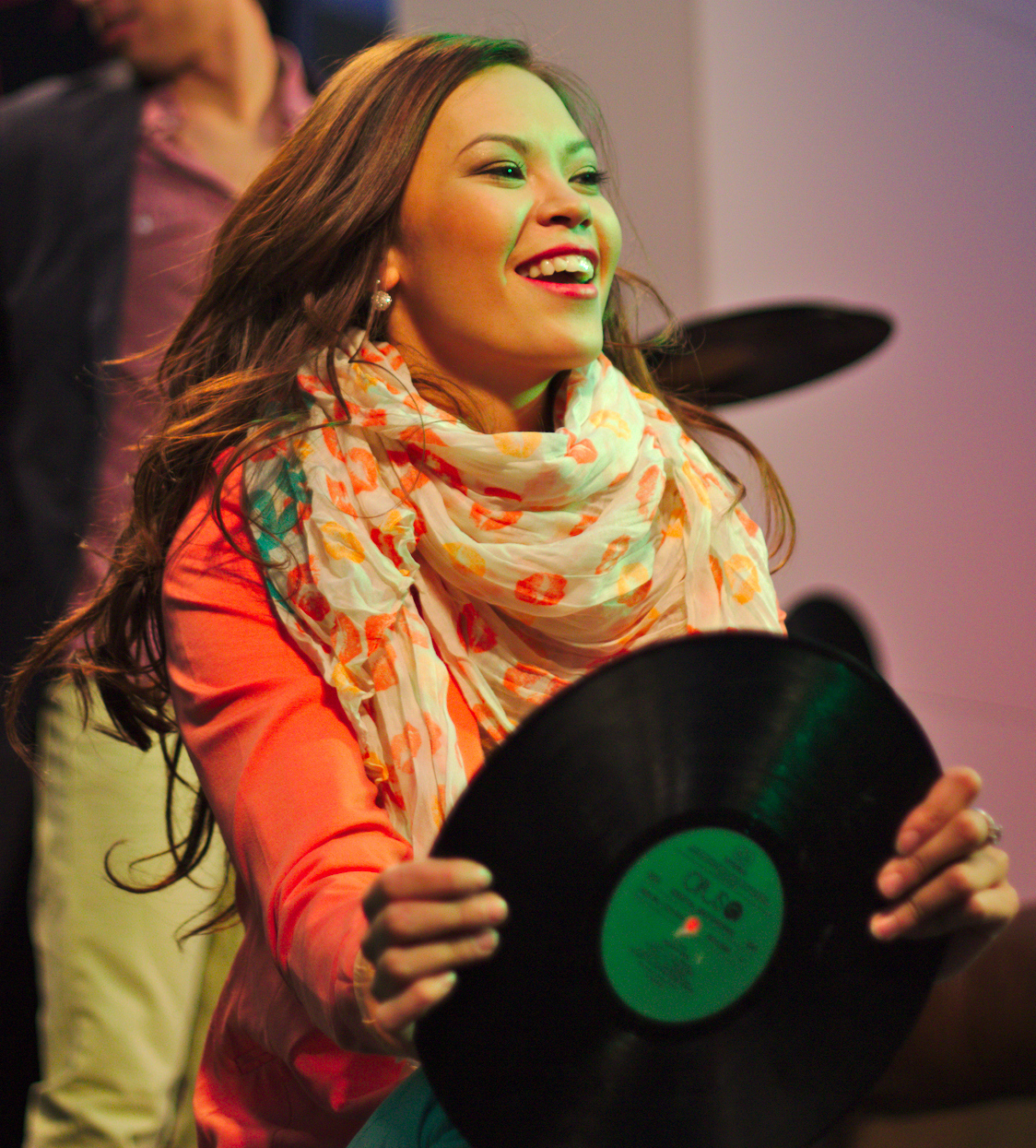
Česká Miss Earth 2013
Monika Leová,
Pardubice

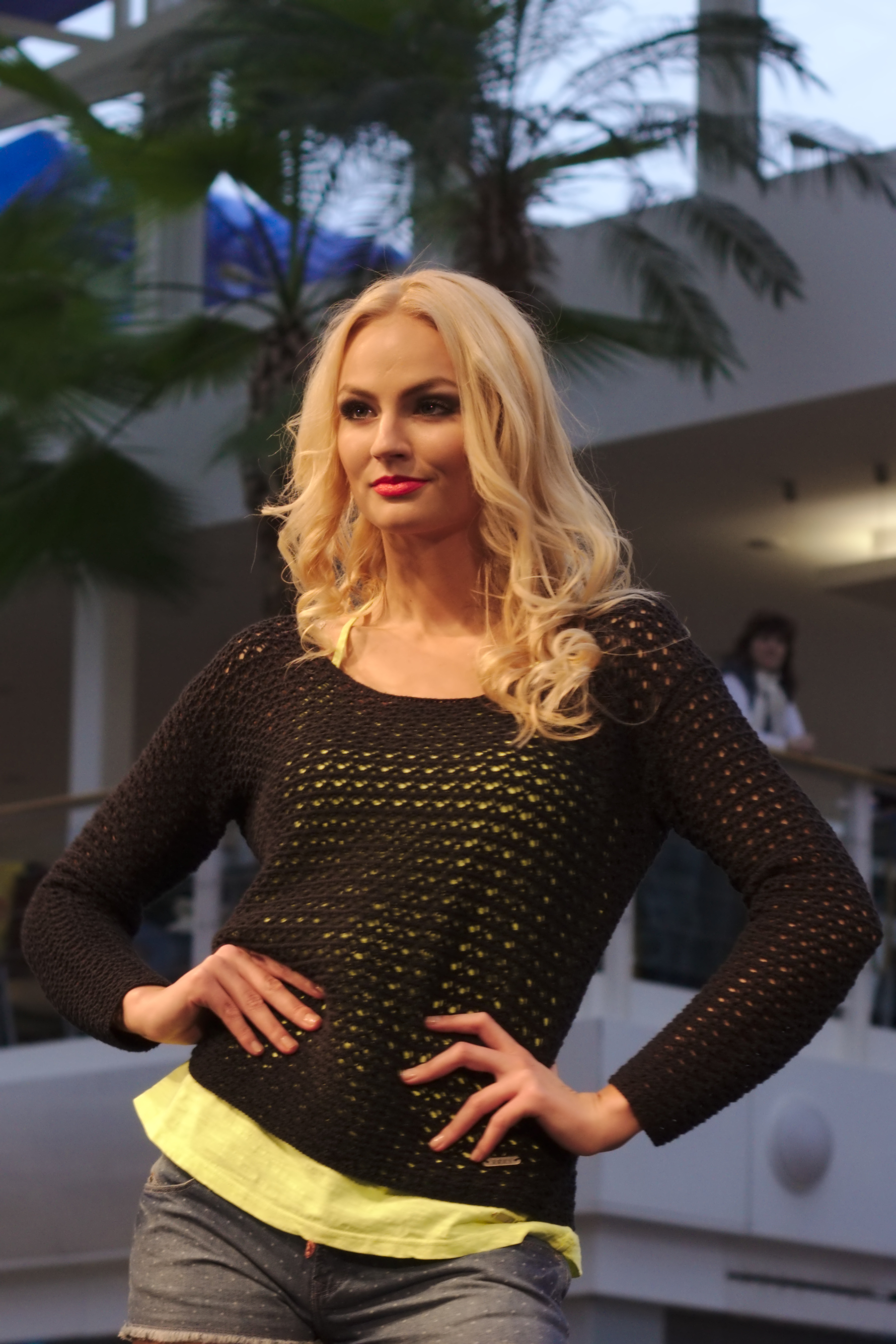
Česká Miss Earth 2012
Tereza Fajksová,
South Moravian Region
Winners Gallery ― Miss Global Czech Republic

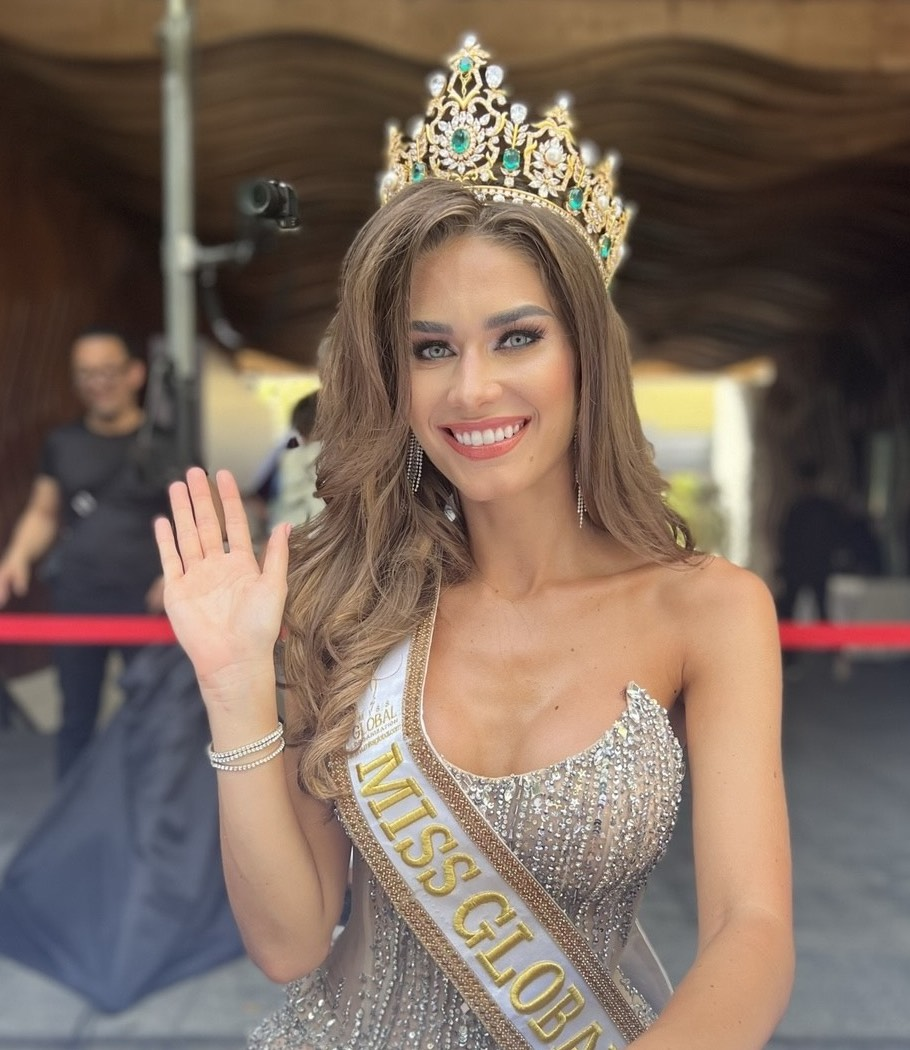
Česká Miss Global 2019 and Miss Global 2019
Karolína Kokešová,
Prague

== See also ==
- Miss Universe
- Miss World
- Miss International
- Miss Earth
- Muž Roku
