= Jitka Nováčková =

Czech model (born 1992)

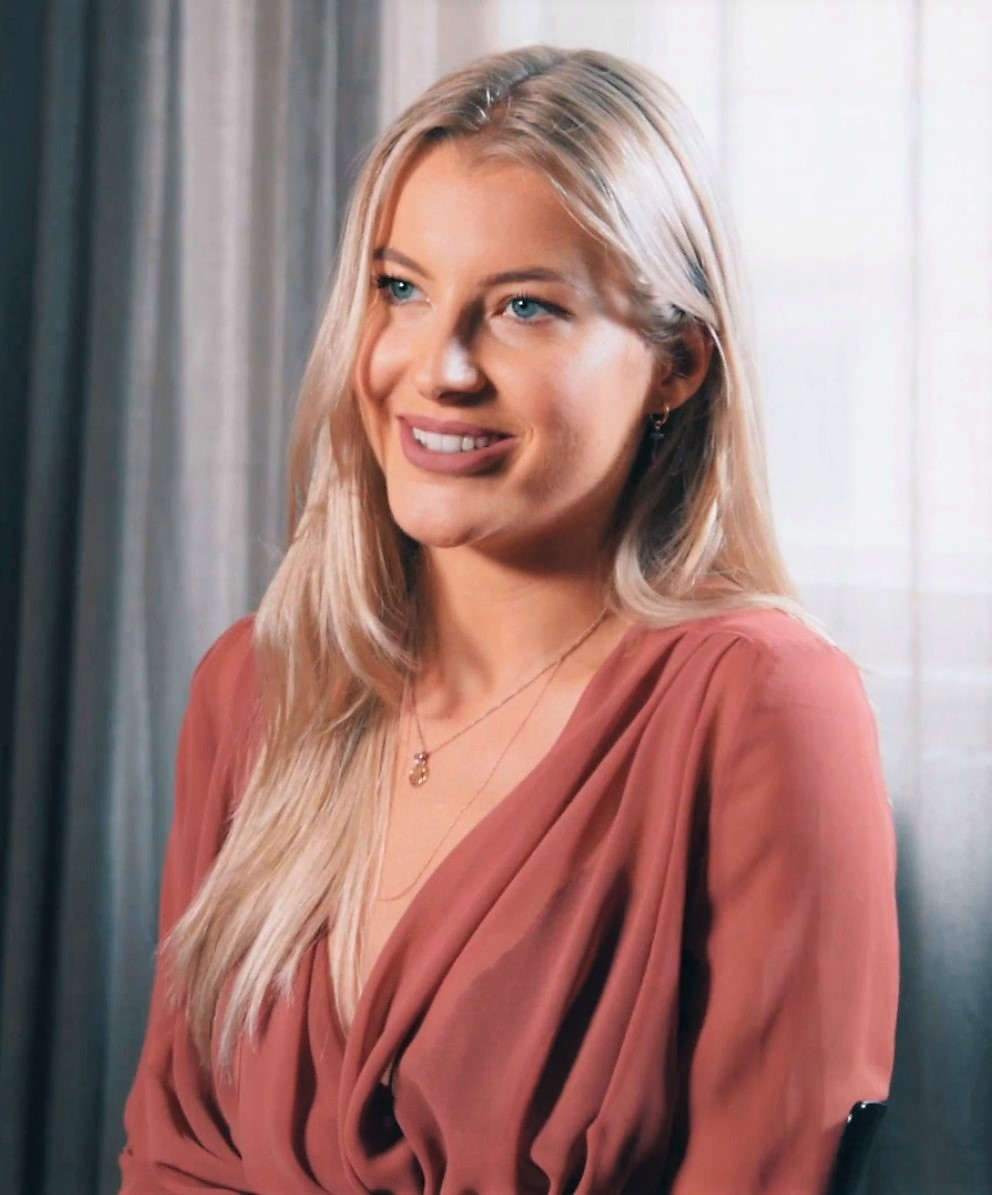
- Nováčková in a 2018 advertisement
- Born: 28 April 1992 (age 34); České Budějovice, Czechoslovakia
- Occupation: Model
- Height: 1.76 m (5 ft 9 in)
- Children: 1
- Beauty pageant titleholder
- Title: Czech Miss 2011
- Hair color: Blonde
- Eye color: Blue
- Major competitions: Czech Miss 2011 (Winner); Miss Universe 2011

Jitka Nováčková (born 28 April 1992) is a Czech model and beauty pageant titleholder who was crowned Czech Miss 2011 and subsequently represented the Czech Republic in the Miss Universe 2011 pageant.

== Early life ==
Born in České Budějovice, Nováčková went to school at Gymnázium Jírovcova and started modeling at age 9. She was a semifinalist in Elite Model Look Czech Republic 2009 and the face of sports apparel manufacturer Nordlbanc and its 2009 spring/summer campaign for the Czech Republic and Slovakia.

== Česká Miss 2011 ==
Nováčková, who stands 1.75 m tall, was crowned as Česká Miss 2011 held on 19 March 2011 at the Karlín Music Theater in Prague, Czech Republic. She succeeded outgoing Česká Miss 2010 and Miss Universe 2010's Top 15 semifinalist, Jitka Válková.

== Miss Universe 2011 ==
As her national pageant winner title, Nováčková officially represented Czech Republic at the Miss Universe 2011 pageant held in September 2011 in São Paulo, Brazil. In the final results, she didn't make it to the semifinals, ending Czech Republic's four year streak of consecutive placements, from 2007 through 2010.

== Personal life ==
Nováčková lives in Prague, Czech Republic.

Since 2017, she has been dating the Finnish professional footballer and captain of the Finland national football team, Tim Sparv. In January 2021 she gave birth to a girl by Tim Sparv.

Awards and achievements
Preceded by Jitka Válková	Czech Miss; 2011	Succeeded by Tereza Chlebovská
