= Monika Leová =

Czech model and presenter (born 1991)

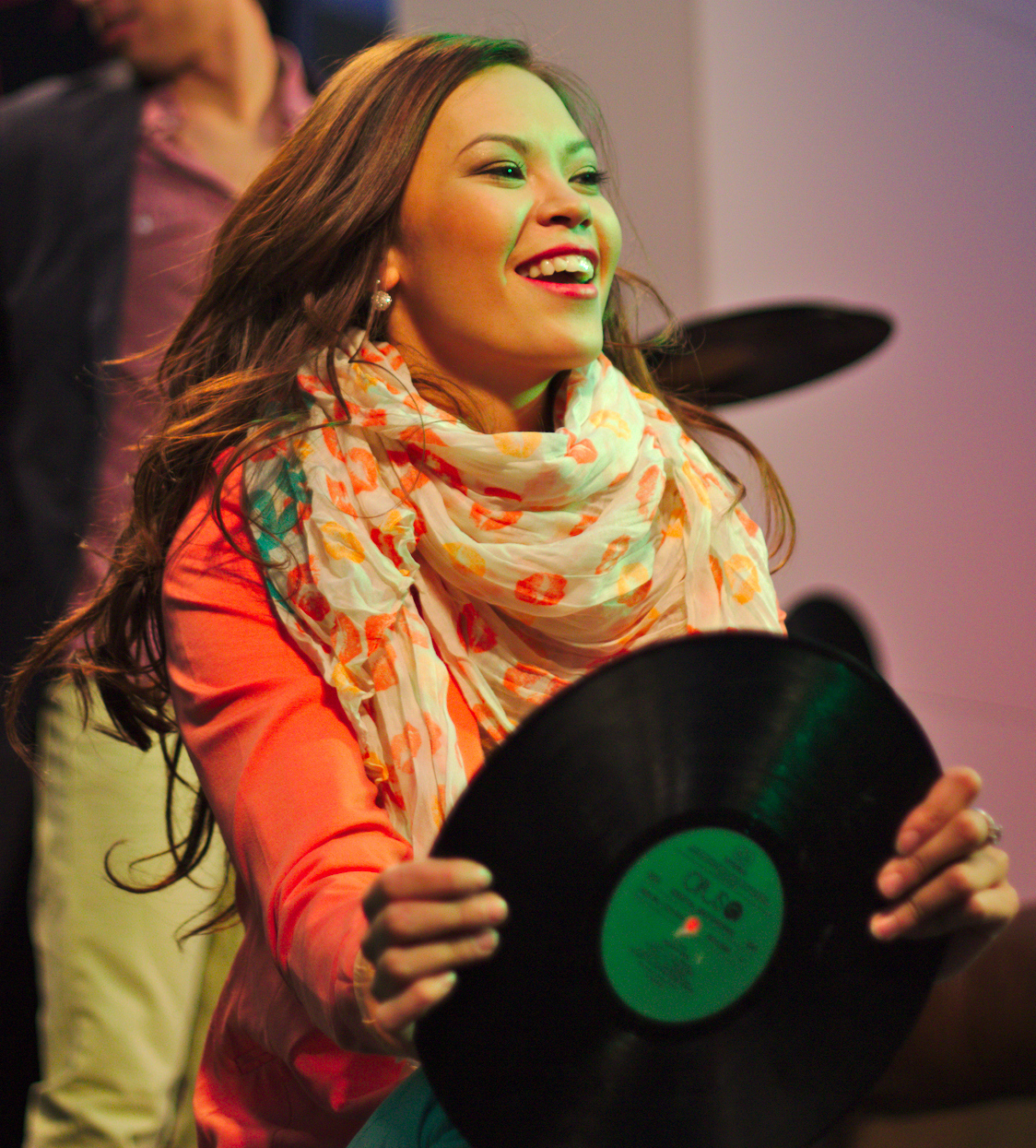
- Born: 23 July 1991 (age 35); Prague, Czechoslovakia
- Education: Faculty of Informatics and Statistics, University of Economics in Prague
- Height: 1.78 m (5 ft 10 in)
- Spouse: Martin Košín (m. 2018)
- Beauty pageant titleholder
- Title: Czech Miss 2013
- Hair color: Brown
- Eye color: Brown

Monika Leová (born 23 July 1991 in Prague) is a Czech TV host, model and beauty pageant titleholder who won Czech Miss 2013 and represented her country at Miss Earth 2013. Monika was born in the Czech Republic to a Vietnamese father (Lê Đình Châu) and a Czech mother. She is fluent in English and Russian.

== See also ==
- Lê dynasty

Awards and achievements
Preceded by Tereza Fajksová	Miss Earth Czech Republic; 2013	Succeeded by Nikola Buranská
