= Josef Erber =

Nazi death camp staff member

Josef Erber (birth name: Josef Houstek) (16 October 1897 – 31 October 1987) was a Nazi German SS-Oberscharführer at Auschwitz concentration camp. He was in charge of the crematoria.

== Early life ==
Erber was an ethnic German born Josef Houstek in Ottendorf, Czech Republic, on October 16, 1897. The town had a population of around 820 at the time. This region of the Czech Republic would not become part of Czechoslovakia until 1918.

== Auschwitz ==
In November of 1940, Houstek was deployed to serve at Auschwitz as a guard. After a stint working in the armory at Auschwitz, he was replaced by Josef Gustav Wieczorek in mid-1942 and promoted to a more powerful position in neighboring Auschwitz II-Birkenau. There, he was responsible for identifying which incoming detainees should be kept alive and which should be sent to the gas chambers. Houstek was also in charge of the women's camp at Birkenau. Personally killing dozens of detainees, he is mentioned several times in the account of Sonderkommando member Filip Müller with a reputation as one of the most notoriously cruel members of the SS personnel.

== Capture ==
After serving at Auschwitz, Josef Houstek changed his name to Josef Erber in 1944. Auschwitz was liberated in January of 1945. Erber was taken prisoner in May of 1945 by the Americans. He was released on December 25, 1947, after which he worked at a spinning mill in Hof, Bavaria for 15 years.

== Arrest and trial ==
On October 1, 1962, Erber was arrested. He was tried at the Frankfurt Auschwitz trials where he earned the nickname "the horror of Birkenau." Erber claimed to be nothing more than a clerk at Auschwitz who had no authority, merely counting the number of arrivals without deciding their fate. He was found guilty of mass murder and sentenced to life in prison.

== Later life ==
In 1985, the 87-year-old Erber was nearly released from prison because of his age in a decision by a lower court. But the Higher Regional Court of Frankfurt overturned this ruling and kept him imprisoned. However, Erber was released from prison the following year. He was killed in a traffic accident at the age of 90 on October 31, 1987.
