= Tereza Skoumalová =

Czech model

- Born: Ostrava, Czech Republic September, 1990
- Height: 177 cm (5 ft 10 in)
- Beauty pageant titleholder
- Title: Česká Miss 2014 (1st Runner-up)
- Hair color: Brown
- Eye color: Green
- Major competitions: Česká Miss 2014 (1st Runner-up); Miss World 2014 (Unplaced)

Tereza Skoumalová is a Czech model and beauty pageant titleholder who won Česká Miss 2014 and represented her country at Miss World 2014. She was crowned as the first runner-up at the Česká Miss 2014.

== Pageants ==
Tereza was crowned Miss Czech Republic World at the Česká Miss 2014 competition on the weekend of March 29–30, 2014.
