= Měřín =

- Market town
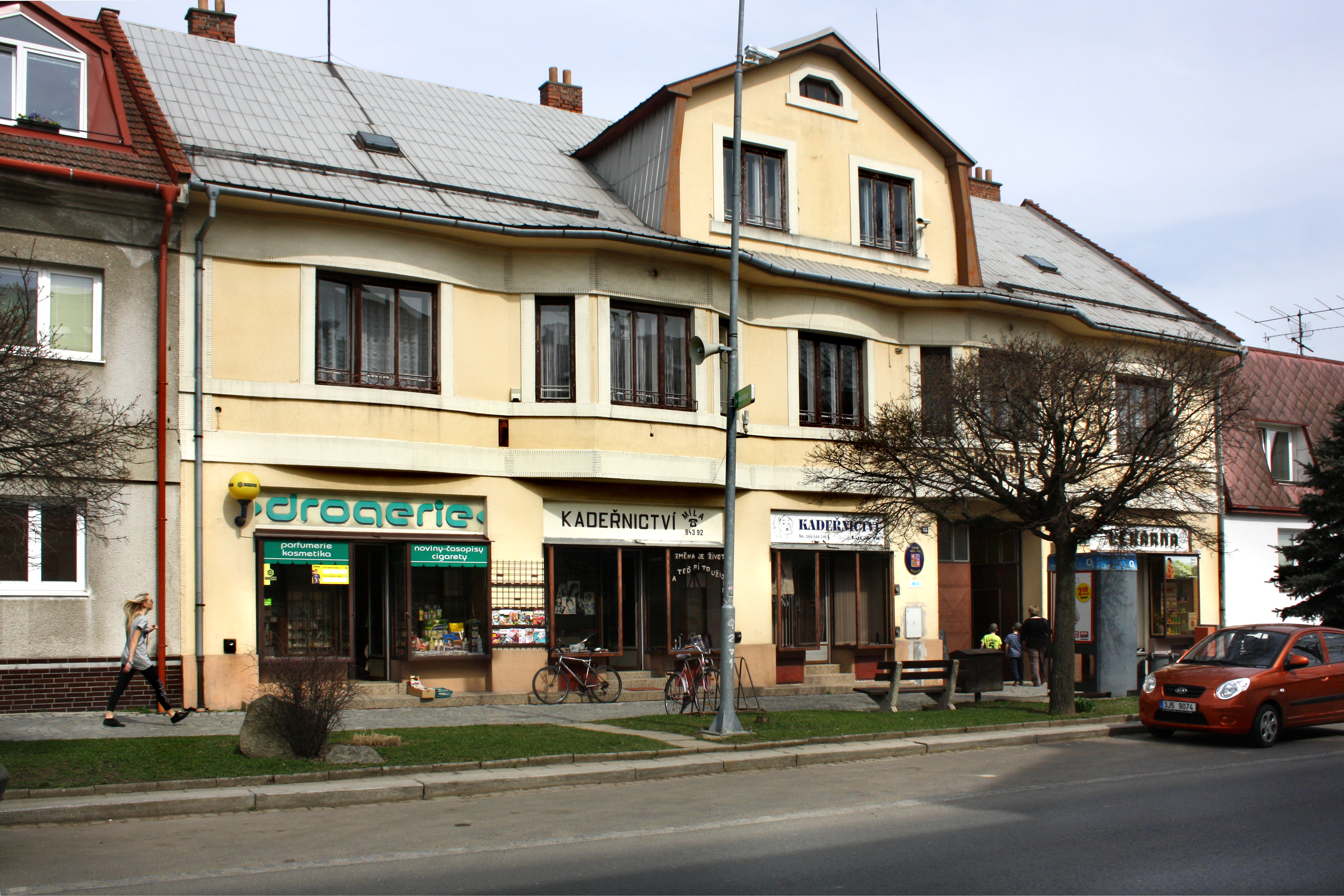
- Municipal office

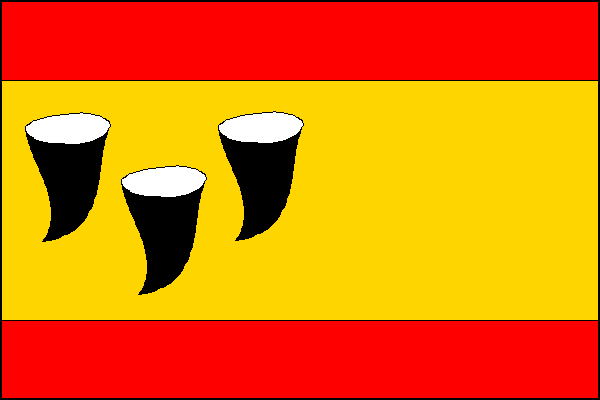
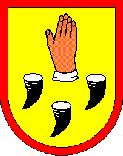
- Flag Coat of arms

- Location in the Czech Republic
- Coordinates: 49°23′36″N 15°53′2″E
- Country: Czech Republic
- Region: Vysočina
- District: Žďár nad Sázavou
- First mentioned: 1298

Area
  - Total: 17.87 km^{2} (6.90 sq mi)
- Elevation: 487 m (1,598 ft)

Population (2026-01-01)
  - Total: 2,009
  - Density: 112.4/km^{2} (291.2/sq mi)
- Time zone: UTC+1 (CET)
  - Summer (DST): UTC+2 (CEST)
- Postal code: 594 42
- Website: www.merin.cz

Měřín (Czech pronunciation: [ˈmɲɛr̝iːn]; German: Wollein) is a market town in Žďár nad Sázavou District in the Vysočina Region of the Czech Republic. It has about 2,000 inhabitants.

== Administrative division ==
Měřín consists of two municipal parts (in brackets population according to the 2021 census):

- Měřín (1,840)
- Pustina (147)

== Geography ==
Měřín is located about 19 kilometres (12 mi) south of Žďár nad Sázavou and 21 km (13 mi) east of Jihlava. It lies in the Křižanov Highlands. The highest point is at 599 m (1,965 ft) above sea level. The Balinka River flows through the market town and supplies there a system of fishponds.

== History ==
The first written mention of Měřín is from 1298, when the Třebíč monastery established there a provostship for monks of the order of St. Benedict. The monastery owend Měřín until 1470. Between 1491 and 1557, Měřín was property of the Pernštejn family. In 1559, Měřín was acquired by the Chroustenský family and became part of the Černá estate. The properties of the family were confiscated after the Battle of White Mountain in 1620. The Černá estate was subsequently handed over to the Collalto family, who annexed it to the Brtnice estate. The Collalto family owned Měřín until 1918.

== Demographics ==
Historical population

| Year | Pop. | ±% |
|---|---|---|
| 1869 | 1,669 | — |
| 1880 | 1,831 | +9.7% |
| 1890 | 1,712 | −6.5% |
| 1900 | 1,747 | +2.0% |
| 1910 | 1,664 | −4.8% |

| Year | Pop. | ±% |
|---|---|---|
| 1921 | 1,578 | −5.2% |
| 1930 | 1,592 | +0.9% |
| 1950 | 1,501 | −5.7% |
| 1961 | 1,582 | +5.4% |
| 1970 | 1,638 | +3.5% |

| Year | Pop. | ±% |
|---|---|---|
| 1980 | 1,768 | +7.9% |
| 1991 | 1,859 | +5.1% |
| 2001 | 1,909 | +2.7% |
| 2011 | 1,956 | +2.5% |
| 2021 | 1,987 | +1.6% |

Source: Censuses

== Transport ==
The D1 motorway from Prague to Brno runs through the market town.

== Sights ==
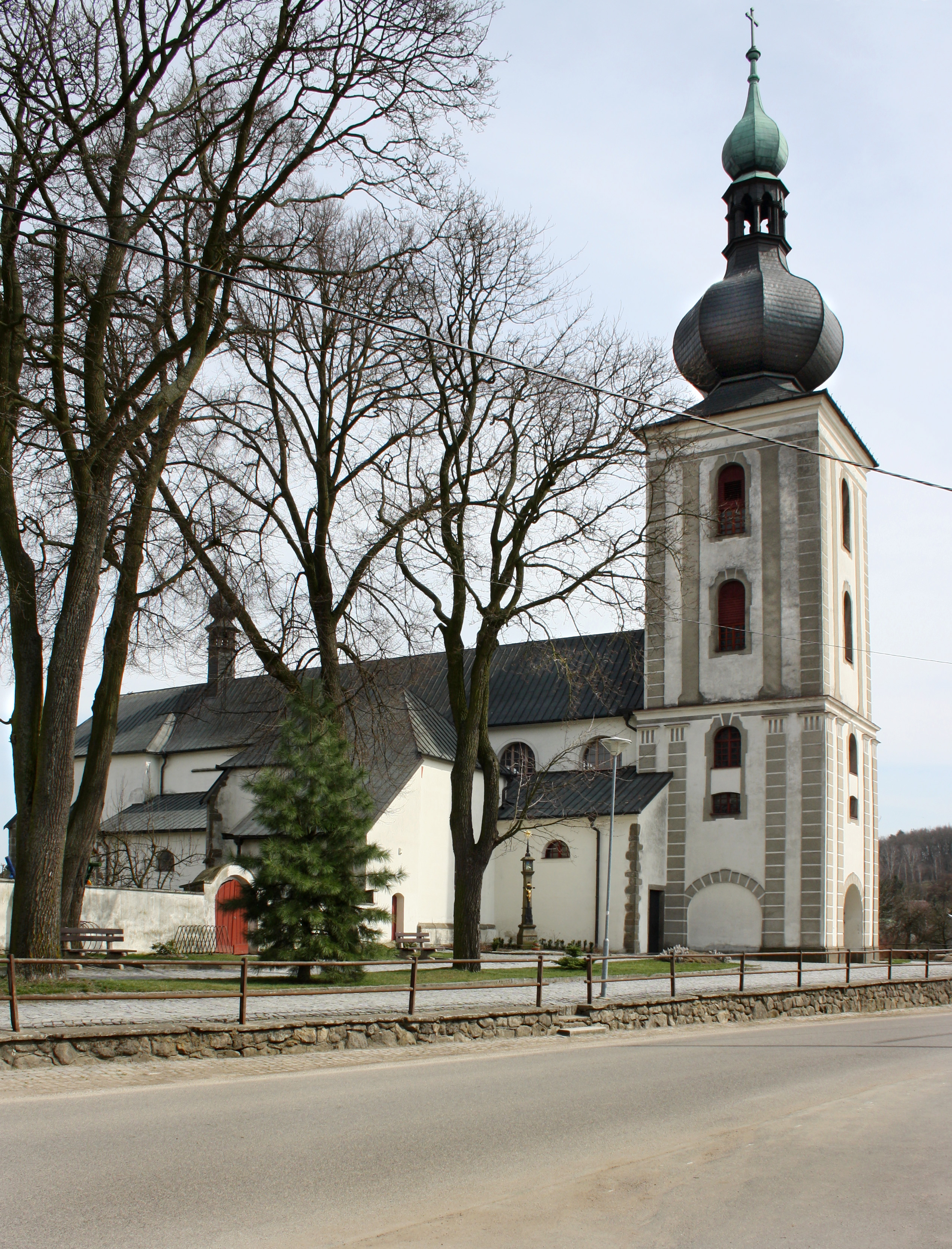
Church of Saint John the Baptist

The main landmark of Měřín is the Church of Saint John the Baptist. It is a Baroque church with a Romanesque core. Despite the Baroque reconstruction, many Romanesque and early Gothic valuable elements have been preserved, including a Romanesque portal from the 13th century.

The Chapel of Our Lady of the Snow is a valuable early Baroque building. It dates from 1690.
