= Svobodné Heřmanice =

- Municipality
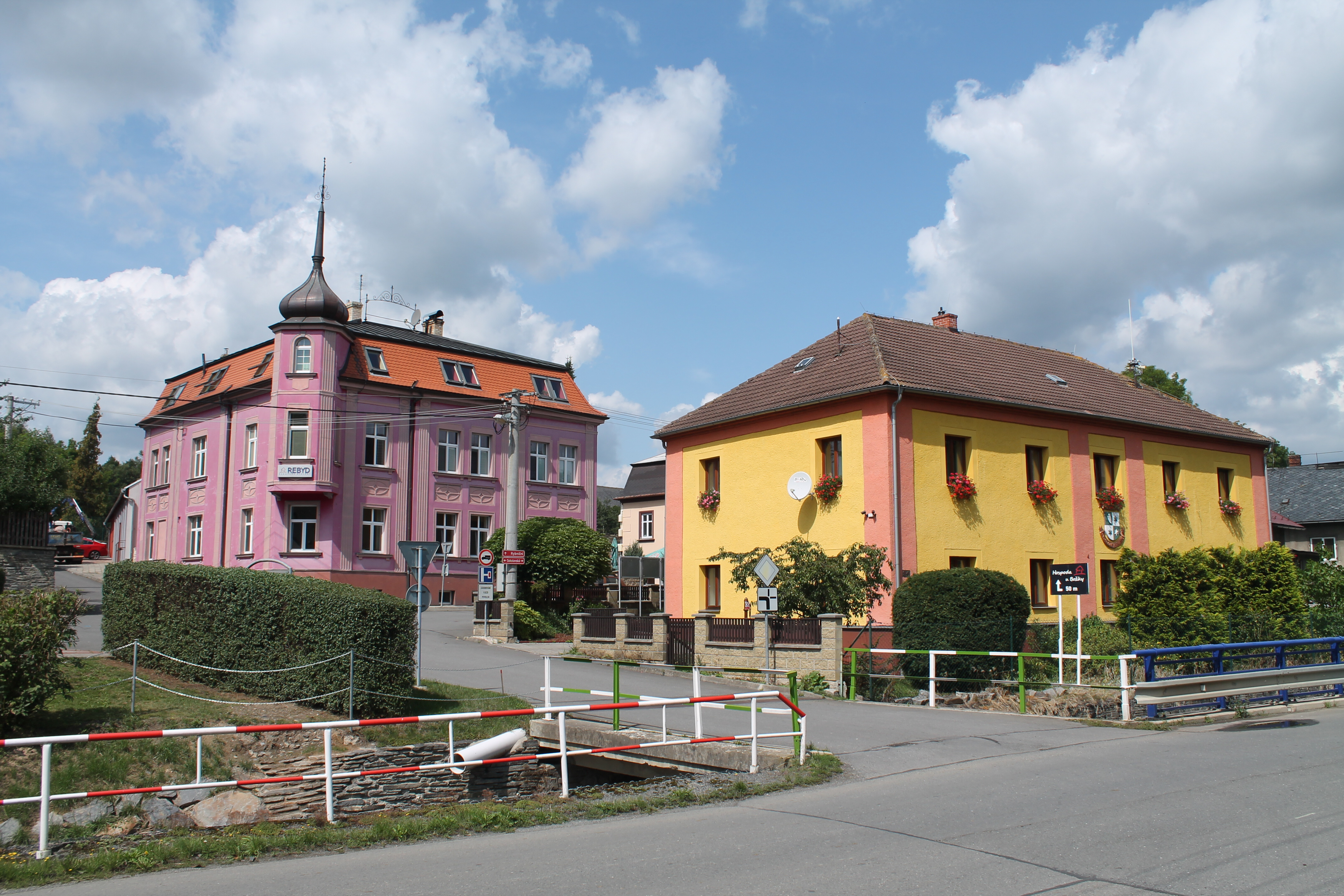
- Centre of Svobodné Heřmanice

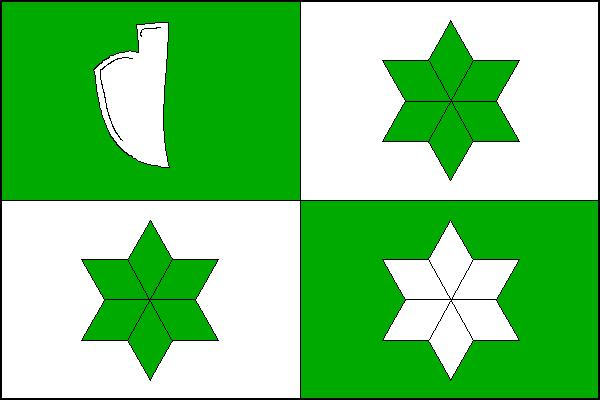
- Flag Coat of arms

- Location in the Czech Republic
- Coordinates: 49°56′46″N 17°40′28″E
- Country: Czech Republic
- Region: Moravian-Silesian
- District: Bruntál
- First mentioned: 1250

Area
  - Total: 11.48 km^{2} (4.43 sq mi)
- Elevation: 398 m (1,306 ft)

Population (2026-01-01)
  - Total: 543
  - Density: 47.3/km^{2} (123/sq mi)
- Time zone: UTC+1 (CET)
  - Summer (DST): UTC+2 (CEST)
- Postal code: 793 12
- Website: www.svobodnehermanice.cz

Svobodné Heřmanice (German: Frei Hermersdorf) is a municipality and village in Bruntál District in the Moravian-Silesian Region of the Czech Republic. It has about 500 inhabitants.

== History ==
The first written mention of Svobodné Heřmanice is in a deed of Pope Innocent IV from 1250.

== Demographics ==
Historical population
Year	Pop.	±%
1869	975	—
1880	1,038	+6.5%
1890	1,083	+4.3%
1900	1,018	−6.0%
1910	951	−6.6%
1921	875	−8.0%
1930	950	+8.6%
1950	546	−42.5%
1961	500	−8.4%
1970	436	−12.8%
1980	433	−0.7%
1991	535	+23.6%
2001	504	−5.8%
2011	527	+4.6%
2021	507	−3.8%
Source: Censuses

== Notable people ==
- Šárka Cojocarová (born 1989), model and beauty pageant titleholder
