= Abryanz Style and Fashion Awards 2016 =

Award Ceremony

- Awarded for: Recognizing excellence in fashion across Africa
- Venue: Kampala Serena Hotel
- Country: Uganda
- Hosted by: Vimbai Mutinhiri; Idris Sultan
- Preshow hosts: Hellen Lukoma; Tinashe Venge
- Acts: Ceaserous; Avril; Runtown; Bebe Cool

Television/radio coverage
- Network: NTV Uganda
- Produced by: Manuela Pacutho

The Abryanz Style and Fashion Awards 2016 is the fourth edition of the Abryanz Style and Fashion Awards and it was held on 9 December 2016 at the Kampala Serena Hotel under the theme Dress to Inspire. Vimbai Mutinhiri and Idris Sultan hosted the awarding event while Hellen Lukoma and Zimbabwe's Tinashe Venge hosted the red carpet event.

This edition was the first to nominate and award continental fashion stakeholders as all the previous editions only nominated and awarded East Africans. The continental launch was held in Namibia at the Windhoek Fashion Week.

Nominations were open to the public on 5 September 2016 and the nominees were unveiled on 27 October 2016 at a media launch at Kampala Serena Hotel.

== Acts and showcases ==
Ugandan artiste Ceaserous performed his hit single Dangerous. Kenya's Avril and Nigeria's Runtown also performed on the awarding stage while Bebe Cool performed at the red carpet event.

Anita Beryl, the winner for Fashion Designer of the year (Uganda) showcased her designer collection. Other showcases were by David Tlale, the highlight showcase of the night and swim model Nina Mirembe who showcased her collection of handmade bikini wear.

== Nominees and winners ==
The winners are highlighted and bold.

Abryanz Style and Fashion Awards Nominees and Winners
Category	Region	Nominees	Result
Style and Fashion Icon Achievement Award	Continental Africa	David Tlale	Won
Humanitarian award	Continental Africa	Millen Magese	Won
Leardership Award	Continental Africa	Humphrey Nabimanya	Won
ASFAs 2016 Tribute	Continental Africa	Papa Wemba (Late)	Won
Designer of the year	Uganda	Anita Beryl	Won
Designer of the year	Uganda	Raphael Kasule	Nominated
Designer of the year	Uganda	Iguana	Nominated
Designer of the year	Uganda	Kwesh UG	Nominated
Designer of the year	Uganda	Ras Kasozi	Nominated
Designer of the year	Uganda	Nanfuka Olivia.	Nominated
Designer of the year	East Africa	Martin Kadinda (Tanzania)	Won
Designer of the year	East Africa	Sheria Ngowi (Tanzania)	Nominated
Designer of the year	East Africa	Bobbins & Seif (Uganda)	Nominated
Designer of the year	East Africa	Moise Turahirwa (Rwanda)	Nominated
Designer of the year	East Africa	Makeke International (Tanzania)	Nominated
Designer of the year	East Africa	Jamila Vera Swai (Tanzania)	Nominated
Designer of the year	West Africa	Mai Atafo (Nigeria)	Won
Designer of the year	West Africa	Lisa Folawiyo (Nigeria)	Nominated
Designer of the year	West Africa	Wanni Fuga (Nigeria)	Nominated
Designer of the year	West Africa	Lanre da Silva (Nigeria)	Nominated
Designer of the year	West Africa	Abrantie The Gentleman (Ghana)	Nominated
Designer of the year	West Africa	Kamsi TCharles (Nigeria)	Nominated
Designer of the year	West Africa	Loza Maléombho (Ivory Coast)	Nominated
Designer of the year	South Africa	Maxhosa Knitwear(South Africa)	Won
Designer of the year	South Africa	Kidd Hunta (Zimbabwe)	Nominated
Designer of the year	South Africa	Intisaar Mukadam (Zimbabwe)	Nominated
Designer of the year	South Africa	Thula Sundi (South Africa)	Nominated
Designer of the year	South Africa	Taibo Bacar (Mozambique)	Nominated
Designer of the year	South Africa	Gert-Johan Coetzee (South Africa)	Nominated
Designer of the year	South Africa	Chisoma Lombe (Zambia)	Nominated
Outstanding Model of the year		Patricia Akello (Uganda)	Won
Outstanding Model of the year		Sharam Diniz	Nominated
Outstanding Model of the year		Mayowa Nicholas (Nigeria)	Nominated
Outstanding Model of the year		Maria Borges (Angola)	Nominated
Outstanding Model of the year		Herieth Paul (Tanzania	Nominated
Outstanding Model of the year		Aamito Stacie Lagum (Uganda)	Nominated
Male Model of the year	Uganda	Waiswa Ronald (Ronnie Volts)	Won
Male Model of the year	Uganda	Mwesigwa Paul	Nominated
Male Model of the year	Uganda	Lucas Stunnar	Nominated
Male Model of the year	Uganda	Adam Gashe	Nominated
Male Model of the year	Uganda	John Iwueke	Nominated
Male Model of the year	Uganda	Housen Mushema	Nominated
Male Model of the year	Continental (Africa)	Sanele Xaba (South Africa)	Won
Male Model of the year	Continental (Africa)	Victor Ndigwe (Nigeria)	Nominated
Male Model of the year	Continental (Africa)	Toyin	Nominated
Male Model of the year	Continental (Africa)	Adonis Bosso	Nominated
Male Model of the year	Continental (Africa)	Dave Kabamba	Nominated
Male Model of the year	Continental (Africa)	Lesala Mampa	Nominated
Female Model of the year	Uganda	Aliba Immaculate	Won
Female Model of the year	Uganda	Vaquisha Eyapu	Nominated
Female Model of the year	Uganda	Rossi Rock	Nominated
Female Model of the year	Uganda	Chandia Dorothy	Nominated
Female Model of the year	Uganda	Betty Mahoro	Nominated
Female Model of the year	Uganda	Rukundo Natalie	Nominated
Female Model of the year	Continental (Africa)	Georgina Akalanyaba (Ghana)	Won
Female Model of the year	Continental (Africa)	Julee Djoulde Bocoum	Nominated
Female Model of the year	Continental (Africa)	Huguette Marara	Nominated
Female Model of the year	Continental (Africa)	Yemi Awoyemi	Nominated
Rising model of the year		Abel Kipaso	Won
Rising model of the year		Ephy Saint	Nominated
Rising model of the year		Chammack Alaye Yambi	Nominated
Rising model of the year		Jay Rwanda	Nominated
Rising model of the year		Darrel Gee	Nominated
Rising model of the year		Ben breaker	Nominated
Best Model Management	Continental (Africa)	Beth Model Management (Nigeria)	Won
Best Model Management	Continental (Africa)	Fusion Models (South Africa)	Nominated
Best Model Management	Continental (Africa)	Myth Model Management (south Africa)	Nominated
Best Model Management	Continental (Africa)	Ice Model Management (South Africa)	Nominated
Best Model Management	Continental (Africa)	Joram Model Management (Uganda)	Nominated
Best Model Management	Continental (Africa)	Boss Models (South Africa)	Nominated
Male Most Stylish/Dressed Celebrity	East Africa	Jamal Gaddafi (Kenya)	Won
Male Most Stylish/Dressed Celebrity	East Africa	Nick Mutuma (Kenya)	Nominated
Male Most Stylish/Dressed Celebrity	East Africa	Jux (Tanzania)	Nominated
Male Most Stylish/Dressed Celebrity	East Africa	Nedy Music (Tanzania)	Nominated
Male Most Stylish/Dressed Celebrity	East Africa	Idris Sultan (Tanzania)	Nominated
Male Most Stylish/Dressed Celebrity	East Africa	Georgie Ndirangu (Rwanda)	Nominated
Male Most Stylish/Dressed Celebrity	West Africa	Richard Mofe-Damijo (Nigeria)	Won
Male Most Stylish/Dressed Celebrity	West Africa	Mai Atafo (Nigeria)	Nominated
Male Most Stylish/Dressed Celebrity	West Africa	IK Ogbonna (Nigeria)	Nominated
Male Most Stylish/Dressed Celebrity	West Africa	Alexx Ekubo(Nigeria)	Nominated
Male Most Stylish/Dressed Celebrity	West Africa	Ric Hassani (Nigeria)	Nominated
Male Most Stylish/Dressed Celebrity	West Africa	Toosweet annan (Ghana)	Nominated
Male Most Stylish/Dressed Celebrity	South Africa	Trevor Stuurman	Won
Male Most Stylish/Dressed Celebrity	South Africa	Maps Maponyane	Nominated
Male Most Stylish/Dressed Celebrity	South Africa	Mthoko Mkhathini	Nominated
Male Most Stylish/Dressed Celebrity	South Africa	N K U L I M	Nominated
Male Most Stylish/Dressed Celebrity	South Africa	Luis Munana	Nominated
Male Most Stylish/Dressed Celebrity	Central Africa	Koffi Olomide	Won
Male Most Stylish/Dressed Celebrity	Central Africa	Fally Ipupa	Nominated
Male Most Stylish/Dressed Celebrity	Central Africa	Awilo Longomba	Nominated
Male Most Stylish/Dressed Celebrity	Central Africa	Ferregolale Padre	Nominated
Female Most Stylish/Dressed Celebrity	Uganda	Pherrie Kimbugwe	Won
Female Most Stylish/Dressed Celebrity	Uganda	Barbie Kyagulanyi	Nominated
Female Most Stylish/Dressed Celebrity	Uganda	Anita Fabiola	Nominated
Female Most Stylish/Dressed Celebrity	Uganda	Judith Heard	Nominated
Female Most Stylish/Dressed Celebrity	Uganda	Crystal Newman	Nominated
Female Most Stylish/Dressed Celebrity	East Africa	Wema Sepetu (Tanzania)	Won
Female Most Stylish/Dressed Celebrity	East Africa	Jokate Mwegelo (Tanzania)	Nominated
Female Most Stylish/Dressed Celebrity	East Africa	Vera Sidika (Kenya)	Nominated
Female Most Stylish/Dressed Celebrity	East Africa	Huddah Monroe (Kenya)	Nominated
Female Most Stylish/Dressed Celebrity	East Africa	Kate Peyton (Rwanda)	Nominated
Female Most Stylish/Dressed Celebrity	East Africa	Wolper Stylish (Tanzania)	Nominated
Female Most Stylish/Dressed Celebrity	West Africa	Deborah Vanessa (Ghana)	Won
Female Most Stylish/Dressed Celebrity	West Africa	Nana Akua Ado (Ghana)	Nominated
Female Most Stylish/Dressed Celebrity	West Africa	Rita Dominic (Nigeria)	Nominated
Female Most Stylish/Dressed Celebrity	West Africa	Juliet Ibrahim (Ghana)	Nominated
Female Most Stylish/Dressed Celebrity	West Africa	Yvonne Nelson (Ghana)	Nominated
Female Most Stylish/Dressed Celebrity	West Africa	Zainab Sheriff (Sierra Leone)	Nominated
Female Most Stylish/Dressed Celebrity	South Africa	Bonang Matheba	Won
Female Most Stylish/Dressed Celebrity	South Africa	Terry Pheto	Nominated
Female Most Stylish/Dressed Celebrity	South Africa	Dillish Mathews	Nominated
Female Most Stylish/Dressed Celebrity	South Africa	Samantha Jannsen	Nominated
Female Most Stylish/Dressed Celebrity	South Africa	Minnie Dlamini	Nominated
Female Most Stylish/Dressed Celebrity	South Africa	Lerato kganyago	Nominated
Female Most Stylish/Dressed Celebrity	South Africa	Tsholo Dikobe(Botswana)	Nominated
Female Most Stylish/Dressed Celebrity	South Africa	Nomzamo Mbatha(South Africa)	Nominated
Female Most Stylish/Dressed Celebrity	Central Africa	Alliance Bahati Kinda (DRC)	Won
Female Most Stylish/Dressed Celebrity	Central Africa	Orfny Fenty	Nominated
Female Most Stylish/Dressed Celebrity	Central Africa	Anado Kabika	Nominated
Female Most Stylish/Dressed Celebrity	Central Africa	Jessica Bossekota	Nominated
Female Most Stylish/Dressed Celebrity	Central Africa	Ally Akindja	Nominated
Most Stylish Male Artiste	Uganda	Eddy Kenzo	Won
Most Stylish Male Artiste	Uganda	Exodus	Nominated
Most Stylish Male Artiste	Uganda	Bobi Wine	Nominated
Most Stylish Male Artiste	Uganda	Atlas	Nominated
Most Stylish Male Artiste	Uganda	Levixone	Nominated
Most Stylish Male Artiste	East Africa	Ali Kiba (Tanzania)	Won
Most Stylish Male Artiste	East Africa	Sauti Sol (Kenya)	Nominated
Most Stylish Male Artiste	East Africa	Diamond Platnumz (Tanzania)	Nominated
Most Stylish Male Artiste	East Africa	Ommy Dimpoz (Tanzania)	Nominated
Most Stylish Male Artiste	West Africa	D'banj (Nigeria)	Won
Most Stylish Male Artiste	West Africa	Falz the bahd Guy (Nigeria)	Nominated
Most Stylish Male Artiste	West Africa	Sarkodie (Ghana)	Nominated
Most Stylish Male Artiste	West Africa	Ice Prince (Nigeria)	Nominated
Most Stylish Male Artiste	West Africa	Wizkid(Nigeria)	Nominated
Most Stylish Male Artiste	West Africa	Adekunle Gold (Nigeria)	Nominated
Most Stylish Male Artiste	South Africa	Theo Kgosinkwe (South Africa)	Won
Most Stylish Male Artiste	South Africa	AKA (South Africa)	Nominated
Most Stylish Male Artiste	South Africa	Riky Rick (South Africa)	Nominated
Most Stylish Male Artiste	South Africa	Black Coffee (South Africa)	Nominated
Most Stylish Female Artiste	Uganda	Desire Luzinda	Won
Most Stylish Female Artiste	Uganda	Sheebah Karungi	Nominated
Most Stylish Female Artiste	Uganda	Renah Nalumansi	Nominated
Most Stylish Female Artiste	Uganda	Iryn Namubiru	Nominated
Most Stylish Female Artiste	Uganda	Irene Ntale	Nominated
Most Stylish Female Artiste	Uganda	Leila Kayondo	Nominated
Most Stylish Female Artiste	East Africa	Vanessa Mdee (Tanzania)	Won
Most Stylish Female Artiste	East Africa	Avril (Kenya)	Nominated
Most Stylish Female Artiste	East Africa	Victoria Kimani (Kenya)	Nominated
Most Stylish Female Artiste	East Africa	Aika Navy kenzo (Tanzania)	Nominated
Most Stylish Female Artiste	West Africa	Yemi Alade (Nigeria)	Won
Most Stylish Female Artiste	West Africa	Mo'Cheddah (Nigeria)	Nominated
Most Stylish Female Artiste	West Africa	Tiwa Savage (Nigeria)	Nominated
Most Stylish Female Artiste	West Africa	Lola Rae (Nigeria)	Nominated
Most Stylish Female Artiste	West Africa	Efya (Ghana)	Nominated
Most Stylish Female Artiste	South Africa	Nhlanhla Nciza (South Africa)	Won
Most Stylish Female Artiste	South Africa	Nadia Nakai (South Africa)	Nominated
Most Stylish Female Artiste	South Africa	Simphiwe Dana (South Africa)	Nominated
Most Stylish Female Artiste	South Africa	Titica (Angola)	Nominated
Most Stylish Female Artiste	South Africa	Zonke (south africa).	Nominated
Best Male Dressed Media Personality	Uganda	Douglas Lwanga	Won
Best Male Dressed Media Personality	Uganda	Crystal Luv	Nominated
Best Male Dressed Media Personality	Uganda	Denzel Mwiyeretsi	Nominated
Best Male Dressed Media Personality	Uganda	De Apeman	Nominated
Best Male Dressed Media Personality	Uganda	Alex Muhangi	Nominated
Best Male Dressed Media Personality	East Africa	Idris Sultan	Won
Best Male Dressed Media Personality	East Africa	Uti Nwachukwu	Nominated
Best Male Dressed Media Personality	East Africa	Falz the bahd Guy	Nominated
Best Male Dressed Media Personality	East Africa	Friday James	Nominated
Best Male Dressed Media Personality	East Africa	Ebuka Obi	Nominated
Best Male Dressed Media Personality	East Africa	Denrele Edun (Nigeria)	Nominated
Best Male Dressed Media Personality	East Africa	Georgie Ndirangu (Rwanda)	Nominated
Best Female Dressed Media Personality	Uganda	Anita Fabiola	Won
Best Female Dressed Media Personality	Uganda	Victoria Bagaya	Nominated
Best Female Dressed Media Personality	Uganda	Fyona Kirabo	Nominated
Best Female Dressed Media Personality	Uganda	Nassali Bettinah	Nominated
Best Female Dressed Media Personality	Uganda	Malaika Nnyanzi	Nominated
Best Female Dressed Media Personality	Uganda	Judithiana	Nominated
Best Female Dressed Media Personality	Uganda	Deedan	Nominated
Best Female Dressed Media Personality	Continental (Africa)	Tracy Wanjiru (Kenya)	Won
Best Female Dressed Media Personality	Continental (Africa)	Vimbai Mutinhiri	Nominated
Best Female Dressed Media Personality	Continental (Africa)	Toke Makinwa (Nigeria)	Nominated
Best Female Dressed Media Personality	Continental (Africa)	Stephanie Coker (Nigeria)	Nominated
Best Female Dressed Media Personality	Continental (Africa)	Bolanle Olukanni	Nominated
Best Female Dressed Media Personality	Continental (Africa)	Berla Mundi	Nominated
Best Female Dressed Media Personality	Continental (Africa)	Bonang Matheba(SouthAfrica)	Nominated
Male Fashionista of the Year	Uganda	Abduz Spot	Won
Male Fashionista of the Year	Uganda	Bover styles	Nominated
Male Fashionista of the Year	Uganda	Anthony Kays	Nominated
Male Fashionista of the Year	Uganda	Williams Bugeme	Nominated
Male Fashionista of the Year	Uganda	Shaminator	Nominated
Male Fashionista of the Year	Uganda	Ssekiranda Allan	Nominated
Male Fashionista of the Year	Uganda	Abby Singh	Nominated
Male Fashionista of the Year	East Africa	Abdy Askar	Won
Male Fashionista of the Year	East Africa	Muriki Kagiri	Nominated
Male Fashionista of the Year	East Africa	Franklin Saiylel	Nominated
Male Fashionista of the Year	East Africa	Stive Lee	Nominated
Male Fashionista of the Year	East Africa	Daniel Weke	Nominated
Male Fashionista of the Year	South Africa	S i v u y i l e Madikana	Won
Male Fashionista of the Year	South Africa	Lungstar Mkwanazi	Nominated
Male Fashionista of the Year	South Africa	Keletso Rakumakoe	Nominated
Male Fashionista of the Year	South Africa	Adriano Visage	Nominated
Male Fashionista of the Year	South Africa	Marcellino Vallihu	Nominated
Male Fashionista of the Year	South Africa	Gemaen Jordan Taylor	Nominated
Male Fashionista of the Year	South Africa	Gilmore Tee	Nominated
Male Fashionista of the Year	Central Africa	Steve Chirha (DRC)	Won
Male Fashionista of the Year	Central Africa	Justine Nsombo(DRC)	Nominated
Male Fashionista of the Year	Central Africa	Gipsy Ilunga	Nominated
Male Fashionista of the Year	Central Africa	Jonathan Zegbe	Nominated
Male Fashionista of the Year	Central Africa	Mwana Metshola	Nominated
Male Fashionista of the Year	Central Africa	Ken Nsiala	Nominated
Male Fashionista of the Year	West Africa	Noble Igwe	Won
Male Fashionista of the Year	West Africa	Akin Faminu	Nominated
Male Fashionista of the Year	West Africa	Mr Asare	Nominated
Male Fashionista of the Year	West Africa	Hakeem Adeyinka balogum	Nominated
Male Fashionista of the Year	West Africa	Josef Adamu	Nominated
Female Fashionista of the Year	Uganda	Nakiranda Cynthia	Won
Female Fashionista of the Year	Uganda	Esther Chanelle	Nominated
Female Fashionista of the Year	Uganda	Nina Roz	Nominated
Female Fashionista of the Year	Uganda	Sera Ponde	Nominated
Female Fashionista of the Year	Uganda	Mwaj Ahmed	Nominated
Female Fashionista of the Year	Uganda	Aron Hilson	Nominated
Female Fashionista of the Year	Uganda	Sarah Joy Bakanansa	Nominated
Female Fashionista of the Year	Uganda	TK Berriez	Nominated
Female Fashionista of the Year	East Africa	Hamisa Mabetto	Won
Female Fashionista of the Year	East Africa	Anita and Lisa Gaitho (Kenya)	Nominated
Female Fashionista of the Year	East Africa	Joy Kendi (Kenya)	Nominated
Female Fashionista of the Year	East Africa	Bridget Shigadi	Nominated
Female Fashionista of the Year	East Africa	Sylvia Njoki	Nominated
Female Fashionista of the Year	East Africa	Diana Machira	Nominated
Female Fashionista of the Year	South Africa	Antonia Shinana	Won
Female Fashionista of the Year	South Africa	Mbo Mahocs	Nominated
Female Fashionista of the Year	South Africa	Sarah Langa Heaton	Nominated
Female Fashionista of the Year	South Africa	Wolf Lulama	Nominated
Female Fashionista of the Year	South Africa	Pokello Nare	Nominated
Female Fashionista of the Year	South Africa	Anelisa Mangcu	Nominated
Female Fashionista of the Year	South Africa	Nangula Nanyemba	Nominated
Female Fashionista of the Year	Central Africa	Naomi Mujinga	Won
Female Fashionista of the Year	Central Africa	Geerie Berry	Nominated
Female Fashionista of the Year	Central Africa	Queen Pokoo	Nominated
Female Fashionista of the Year	Central Africa	Afi Elizabeth	Nominated
Female Fashionista of the Year	Central Africa	Monica Flowe	Nominated
Female Fashionista of the Year	Central Africa	Charlotte Kamale	Nominated
Female Fashionista of the Year	Central Africa	Alliance Kidja Bahati	Nominated
Female Fashionista of the Year	West Africa	Sharon Ojong	Won
Female Fashionista of the Year	West Africa	Empress Jamila	Nominated
Female Fashionista of the Year	West Africa	Sandra Ankobiah	Nominated
Female Fashionista of the Year	West Africa	Missaei Ameena	Nominated
Hair Stylist of the Year	Uganda	Hair by Zziwa	Won
Hair Stylist of the Year	Uganda	Mart Barber	Nominated
Hair Stylist of the Year	Uganda	Martyn Ssekyanzi	Nominated
Hair Stylist of the Year	Uganda	Grace Warren	Nominated
Hair Stylist of the Year	Uganda	Sula’s Saloon	Nominated
Makeup Artist of the Year	Uganda	Zipper Atafo	Won
Makeup Artist of the Year	Uganda	Fyona Kirabo	Nominated
Makeup Artist of the Year	Uganda	Mona Faces	Nominated
Makeup Artist of the Year	Uganda	Fayth Presh	Nominated
Makeup Artist of the Year	Uganda	Pamela Musiimenta	Nominated
Makeup Artist of the Year	East Africa	Claudine Mwangachuchu (Rwanda)	Won
Makeup Artist of the Year	East Africa	Muthoni Njoba	Nominated
Makeup Artist of the Year	East Africa	Maya mia	Nominated
Makeup Artist of the Year	East Africa	Steve Koby	Nominated
Makeup Artist of the Year	East Africa	Milly_Umuhoza_Vanly	Nominated
Makeup Artist of the Year	East Africa	Fauzia Abdulkadir	Nominated
Makeup Artist of the Year	West Africa	Anita Brows	Won
Makeup Artist of the Year	West Africa	Lewina David	Nominated
Makeup Artist of the Year	West Africa	Tintsmakeuppro	Nominated
Makeup Artist of the Year	West Africa	Oshewabeauty	Nominated
Makeup Artist of the Year	West Africa	Bimpe Onakoya	Nominated
Makeup Artist of the Year	West Africa	Jide of St. Ola	Nominated
Makeup Artist of the Year	South Africa	Clara Chimeloane	Won
Makeup Artist of the Year	South Africa	Vuyovaroy	Nominated
Makeup Artist of the Year	South Africa	Nthatomashishi	Nominated
Makeup Artist of the Year	South Africa	Lucoh	Nominated
Makeup Artist of the Year	South Africa	Missjeyarts_makeup	Nominated
Makeup Artist of the Year	South Africa	Tlhomamo	Nominated
Fashion photographer of the year	Uganda	Blush Media	Won
Fashion photographer of the year	Uganda	Oneal Mujjumbura	Nominated
Fashion photographer of the year	Uganda	Alexander Photography	Nominated
Fashion photographer of the year	Uganda	Twenny Benjamin	Nominated
Fashion photographer of the year	Uganda	Rolland Manzi	Nominated
Fashion photographer of the year	Uganda	Ronnie Bob	Nominated
Fashion photographer of the year	Continental (Africa)	NIB Studio	Won
Fashion photographer of the year	Continental (Africa)	BuoArt	Nominated
Fashion photographer of the year	Continental (Africa)	William nsai	Nominated
Fashion photographer of the year	Continental (Africa)	Giulio Molfese	Nominated
Fashion photographer of the year	Continental (Africa)	Charlene Asare	Nominated
Fashion photographer of the year	Continental (Africa)	Gilbert Asante	Nominated
Fashion photographer of the year	Continental (Africa)	Clemence photography	Nominated
Fashion photographer of the year	Continental (Africa)	Victor Peace	Nominated
Fashion photographer of the year	Continental (Africa)	Trevor Stuurman	Nominated
Stylist of the Year	Uganda	Kaijuka Abbas	Won
Stylist of the Year	Uganda	Phauz Fashion King	Nominated
Stylist of the Year	Uganda	Fatuma Asha	Nominated
Stylist of the Year	Uganda	Posh by KC	Nominated
Stylist of the Year	Uganda	Chuck Salvator	Nominated
Stylist of the Year	Uganda	Tazibone Solomon	Nominated
Stylist of the Year	East Africa	Brian Babu	Won
Stylist of the Year	East Africa	JM International	Nominated
Stylist of the Year	East Africa	Annabel Onyango	Nominated
Stylist of the Year	East Africa	Irfan Rizwanali	Nominated
Stylist of the Year	East Africa	Wambiu Thimba	Nominated
Stylist of the Year	South Africa	Reinhard Mahale	Won
Stylist of the Year	South Africa	Lourens Gebhardt	Nominated
Stylist of the Year	South Africa	Shaun Stylist	Nominated
Stylist of the Year	South Africa	Gaone Mothini & Tsholo Dikobe	Nominated
Stylist of the Year	South Africa	Craig Zoowie	Nominated
Stylist of the Year	South Africa	Dimeji Alara	Nominated
Stylist of the Year	South Africa	Pholoso Selebogo	Nominated
Stylist of the Year	South Africa	Louis Phillipe De Gagoue	Nominated
Stylist of the Year	West Africa	Sam Desalu	Won
Stylist of the Year	West Africa	Adebayo Okelawal	Nominated
Stylist of the Year	West Africa	Bubu ogisi	Nominated
Stylist of the Year	West Africa	Mellisa Akposoe	Nominated
Stylist of the Year	West Africa	Swanky Jerry	Nominated
Stylist of the Year	West Africa	Memsor Kamarake	Nominated
Fashionable Music Video of the Year	Uganda	Dede by Bebe Cool	Won
Fashionable Music Video of the Year	Uganda	Magic- Winnie Nwangi	Nominated
Fashionable Music Video of the Year	Uganda	Mukyala Mwami – Aganaaga	Nominated
Fashionable Music Video of the Year	Uganda	Nkwatako – Sheebah Karungi	Nominated
Fashionable Music Video of the Year	Uganda	Manifesto -Leila Kayondo	Nominated
Fashionable Music Video of the Year	Uganda	Byagana- Radio and Weasal ft. Ziza Bafana	Nominated
Fashionable Music Video of the Year	Uganda	Bingi- New Chapter	Nominated
Fashionable Music Video of the Year	Continental (Africa)	Aje by Ali Kiba	Won
Fashionable Music Video of the Year	Continental (Africa)	Mamacita-Tinie Tempah ft. Wizkid	Nominated
Fashionable Music Video of the Year	Continental (Africa)	Colours of Africa- Diamond Platnumz ft. Mafikizolo]	Nominated
Fashionable Music Video of the Year	Continental (Africa)	Soft Work- Falz the bahd Guy	Nominated
Fashionable Music Video of the Year	Continental (Africa)	Niroge - Vanessa Mdee	Nominated
Fashionable Music Video of the Year	Continental (Africa)	No Kissing- Patoranking ft. Sarkodie	Nominated
Fashionable Music Video of the Year	Continental (Africa)	If I start to talk- Tiwa Savage ft. Dr SID	Nominated
Fashionable Music Video of the Year	Continental (Africa)	Tulale Fofofo- Mi Casa FT. Sauti Sol	Nominated
Fashionable Music Video of the Year	Continental (Africa)	Kontrol- Maleek Berry	Nominated
Fashion Blogger / Writer of the Year	Uganda	Mugume Canary	Won
Fashion Blogger / Writer of the Year	Uganda	Lamic Kirabo	Nominated
Fashion Blogger / Writer of the Year	Uganda	Hersan Ssentongo	Nominated
Fashion Blogger / Writer of the Year	Uganda	Eleanor Mirembe	Nominated
Fashion Blogger / Writer of the Year	Uganda	Grace Nafuna	Nominated
Fashion Blogger / Writer of the Year	Uganda	Samson Baranga	Nominated
Fashion Blogger / Writer of the Year	Continental (Africa)	Sylvia Njoki	Won
Fashion Blogger / Writer of the Year	Continental (Africa)	Akin Faminu	Nominated
Fashion Blogger / Writer of the Year	Continental (Africa)	Charlie Kamale	Nominated
Fashion Blogger / Writer of the Year	Continental (Africa)	Sharon Ojong	Nominated
Fashion Blogger / Writer of the Year	Continental (Africa)	Aisha Baker Parnell	Nominated
Fashion Blogger / Writer of the Year	Continental (Africa)	Richard Akuson	Nominated
Fashion Blogger / Writer of the Year	Continental (Africa)	Sharon Mundia	Nominated
Fashion Blogger / Writer of the Year	Continental (Africa)	Jacqueline Albert Terry	Nominated
Fashion Blogger / Writer of the Year	Continental (Africa)	Muriuki kagiri	Nominated
Most stylish couple	Continental (Africa)	Annabel Onyango & Marek Fuchs (Kenya)	Won
Most stylish couple	Continental (Africa)	Barbie and Bobi Wine (Uganda)	Nominated
Most stylish couple	Continental (Africa)	Bonang Matheba & AKA(South Africa)	Nominated
Most stylish couple	Continental (Africa)	Zari Tlale & Diamond Platnumz (Tanzania)	Nominated
Most stylish couple	Continental (Africa)	Mr & Mrs Ayo Makun (Nigeria)	Nominated
Most stylish couple	Continental (Africa)	Elikem & Pokello Nare (Zimbabwe)	Nominated
Continental style & fashion influencer (male)	Continental (Africa)	David Tlale (South Africa)	Won
Continental style & fashion influencer (male)	Continental (Africa)	Trevor Stuurman	Nominated
Continental style & fashion influencer (male)	Continental (Africa)	Mai Atafo	Nominated
Continental style & fashion influencer (female)	Continental (Africa)	Bonang Matheba (South Africa)	Won
Continental style & fashion influencer (female)	Continental (Africa)	Diana Opoti (Kenya)	Nominated
Continental style & fashion influencer (female)	Continental (Africa)	Jennifer Obayuwana (Nigeria)	Nominated
Most stylish Ugandan in the diaspora (Male)		Adam Ddumba	Won
Most stylish Ugandan in the diaspora (Male)		Alecool	Nominated
Most stylish Ugandan in the diaspora (Male)		Meddie More	Nominated
Most stylish Ugandan in the diaspora (Male)		Prince MJ	Nominated
Most stylish Ugandan in the diaspora (Female)		Krina Styla	Won
Most stylish Ugandan in the diaspora (Female)		Sheila Nabunya	Nominated
Most stylish Ugandan in the diaspora (Female)		Louise Kamya	Nominated
Most stylish Ugandan in the diaspora (Female)		Regina Carol	Nominated
Most stylish Ugandan in the diaspora (Female)		Lucy Smize	Nominated
Most stylish Ugandan in the diaspora (Female)		Rachel K	Nominated
Most stylish African in the diaspora (male)	Continental (Africa)	Zeddie Loky	Won
Most stylish African in the diaspora (male)	Continental (Africa)	Lolu Esq	Nominated
Most stylish African in the diaspora (male)	Continental (Africa)	Steven Onoja	Nominated
Most stylish African in the diaspora (male)	Continental (Africa)	Henry Coffie.	Nominated
Most stylish African in the diaspora (male)	Continental (Africa)	Hush Puppi	Nominated
Most stylish African in the diaspora (male)	Continental (Africa)	Emmanuel Austin	Nominated
Most stylish African in the diaspora (Female)	Continental (Africa)	Didi Olomide	Won
Most stylish African in the diaspora (Female)	Continental (Africa)	Shirley Beniang	Nominated
Most stylish African in the diaspora (Female)	Continental (Africa)	Fisayo longe	Nominated
Most stylish African in the diaspora (Female)	Continental (Africa)	Melissa Akposoe	Nominated
Most stylish African in the diaspora (Female)	Continental (Africa)	Soraya De Carvalho	Nominated
Most stylish African in the diaspora (Female)	Continental (Africa)	Toun AJ	Nominated
Fashion event of the year	Uganda	Blankets & Wine	Won
Fashion event of the year	Uganda	Kampala Fashion Week	Nominated
Fashion event of the year	Uganda	Malengo HOT PINK catwalk	Nominated
Fashion event of the year	Uganda	Paple Rayn	Nominated
Fashion event of the year	Uganda	Bride and Groom expo.	Nominated
Best Dressed traditional/religious leader	Uganda	Prophet Elvis Mbonye	Won
Best Dressed traditional/religious leader	Uganda	Pastor Mondo Mugisha	Nominated
Best Dressed traditional/religious leader	Uganda	David Happy Ngabo	Nominated
Best Dressed traditional/religious leader	Uganda	Prince Wassajja	Nominated
Fashion Brand of the year	Uganda	Bold Kampala	Won
Fashion Brand of the year	Uganda	Paple Rayn	Nominated
Fashion Brand of the year	Uganda	Emporio Milano	Nominated
Fashion Brand of the year	Uganda	Woolworth	Nominated
Fashion Brand of the year	Uganda	Mr. Price	Nominated
Crossing Boarders with Fashion	Continental (Africa)	Lupita Nyongo	Won
Crossing Boarders with Fashion	Continental (Africa)	Jidenna	Nominated
Crossing Boarders with Fashion	Continental (Africa)	Ugo Mozie	Nominated
Crossing Boarders with Fashion	Continental (Africa)	LOLU ESQ	Nominated
