= Abryanz Style and Fashion Awards 2018 =

Award ceremony

- Awarded for: Fifth ASFA Awards
- Date: 7 December 2018
- Venue: Serena Hotel, Kampala
- Country: Uganda
- Hosted by: Anita Nderu; Tracy Wanjiru
- Acts: Spice Diana; Lydia Jazmine; Lilian Mbabazi
- Website: https://abryanzstyleandfashionawards.com

Abryanz Style and Fashion Awards 2018 was held on 7 December 2018 and marked the sixth edition of the Abryanz Style and Fashion Awards (ASFAs).

The event, under the theme Fashion is Power, was hosted by Kenyan radio and television personalities Anita Nderu and Tracy Wanjiru, and featured fashion showcases from Nigeria's Mai Atafo, South Africa's David Tlale and Laduma Ngoxokolo, Uganda's Anita Beryl of Beryl Couture, Alex Alecool of Alecool Clothing and Kkoolo. Spice Diana, Lydia Jazmine and Lilian Mbabazi performed their music with Lilian paying a tribute to her former spouse, the late Mowzey Radio.

Nominations started on August 27, 2018, and closed on 27 September. The list of nominees was then released at a cocktail party on 27 October 2018 held at the Serena Hotel in Kampala and voting was opened in late November.

== Nominees and winners ==
Abryanz Style and Fashion Awards Nominees and Winners
Category	Region	Nominees	Result
Humanitarian award		Rio Paul the Stylist	Won
Designer of the year	Uganda	Fatuma Asha	Won
Designer of the year	Uganda	Anita Beryl	Nominated
Designer of the year	Uganda	Iguana	Nominated
Designer of the year	Uganda	Stella Atal	Nominated
Designer of the year	Uganda	Sham Tyra	Nominated
Designer of the year	Uganda	Joe Malaika	Nominated
Designer of the year	Africa	Maxhosa By Laduma (South Africa)	Won
Designer of the year	Africa	Chusuwanapha (South Africa)	Nominated
Designer of the year	Africa	Soraya Da Piedade (Angola)	Nominated
Designer of the year	Africa	House Of Tayo (Rwanda)	Nominated
Designer of the year	Africa	Taibo Bakhar (Mozambique)	Nominated
Outstanding Model of the year	Uganda	Paul Mwesigwa	Won
Outstanding Model of the year	Uganda	Anyon Ansola	Nominated
Outstanding Model of the year	Uganda	Aketch Joy Winnie	Nominated
Outstanding Model of the year	Uganda	Ayak Vernonica	Nominated
Outstanding Model of the year	Africa	Dylan Wentzel (South Africa(	Won
Outstanding Model of the year	Africa	Adonis Bosso (Ivory Coast)	Nominated
Outstanding Model of the year	Africa	Happy Jacqueline (Rwanda)	Nominated
Outstanding Model of the year	Africa	Graobe Noelle (Cameroon)	Nominated
Outstanding Model of the year	Africa	Dave Kabamba (Congo)	Nominated
Most Stylish Male Celebrity of the Year	Africa	Tobi Bakre	Won
Most Stylish Male Celebrity of the Year	Africa	Ebuka	Nominated
Most Stylish Male Celebrity of the Year	Africa	DJ Spinall	Nominated
Most Stylish Male Celebrity of the Year	Africa	Denola Grey	Nominated
Most Stylish Female Celebrity of the Year	Uganda	Judith Heard	Won
Most Stylish Female Celebrity of the Year	Uganda	Sheila Gashumba	Nominated
Most Stylish Female Celebrity of the Year	Uganda	Rachel K	Nominated
Most Stylish Female Celebrity of the Year	Uganda	Judithiana	Nominated
Most Stylish Female Celebrity of the Year	Uganda	Sue Ochola Deroy	Nominated
Most Stylish Female Celebrity of the Year	Africa	Dillish Mathews (Namibia)	Won
Most Stylish Female Celebrity of the Year	Africa	Amina Abdi (Kenya)	Nominated
Most Stylish Female Celebrity of the Year	Africa	Nomzamo Mbatha (South Africa)	Nominated
Most Stylish Female Celebrity of the Year	Africa	Nana Akua Addo (Ghana)	Nominated
Most Stylish Female Celebrity of the Year	Africa	Zynnell Lydia (Ghana)	Nominated
Most Stylish Male Artiste	Uganda	A Pass	Won
Most Stylish Male Artiste	Uganda	Exodus	Nominated
Most Stylish Male Artiste	Uganda	Fik Fameika	Nominated
Most Stylish Male Artiste	Uganda	Eddy Kenzo	Nominated
Most Stylish Male Artiste	Uganda	Beenie Gunter	Nominated
Most Stylish Male Artiste	Africa	Octopizzo (Kenya)	Won
Most Stylish Male Artiste	Africa	Sauti Sol (Kenya)	Nominated
Most Stylish Male Artiste	Africa	Riky Rick (South Africa)	Nominated
Most Stylish Male Artiste	Africa	Fally Ipupa (DRC)	Nominated
Most Stylish Male Artiste	Africa	Runtown (Nigeria)	Nominated
Most Stylish Female Artiste	Uganda	Spice Diana	Won
Most Stylish Female Artiste	Uganda	Vinka	Nominated
Most Stylish Female Artiste	Uganda	Nina Roz	Nominated
Most Stylish Female Artiste	Uganda	Lydia Jazmine	Nominated
Most Stylish Female Artiste	Uganda	Ang3lina	Nominated
Most Stylish Female Artiste	Africa	Vanessa Mdee (Tanzania)	Won
Most Stylish Female Artiste	Africa	Tiwa Savage (Nigeria)	Nominated
Most Stylish Female Artiste	Africa	Seyi Shay (Nigeria)	Nominated
Most Stylish Female Artiste	Africa	Efya (Ghana)	Nominated
Most Stylish Female Artiste	Africa	Oteya (Namibia)	Nominated
Male Fashionista of the Year	Uganda	Brandon Brandon	Won
Male Fashionista of the Year	Uganda	Sir Owen Dapper	Nominated
Male Fashionista of the Year	Uganda	Zipper Atafo	Nominated
Male Fashionista of the Year	Uganda	Abduz Spot	Nominated
Male Fashionista of the Year	Uganda	Lord Sanie	Nominated
Male Fashionista of the Year	Africa	Amar Jonathan (Kenya)	Won
Male Fashionista of the Year	Africa	Noble Igwe (Nigeria)	Nominated
Male Fashionista of the Year	Africa	Galal Muhammad (Sudan)	Nominated
Male Fashionista of the Year	Africa	Stive Lee (Tanzania)	Nominated
Male Fashionista of the Year	Africa	Akin Faminu (Nigeria)	Nominated
Female Fashionista of the Year	Uganda	Kasirye Hauer	Won
Female Fashionista of the Year	Uganda	Aaron Hilson	Nominated
Female Fashionista of the Year	Uganda	Meg Lusembo	Nominated
Female Fashionista of the Year	Uganda	Udy The Gemini	Nominated
Female Fashionista of the Year	Africa	Sarah Langa	Won
Female Fashionista of the Year	Africa	Tshego Manche	Nominated
Female Fashionista of the Year	Africa	Kefilwe Mabote	Nominated
Female Fashionista of the Year	Africa	Lauren Campbell	Nominated
Hair Stylist of the Year	Uganda	Gray Cee Hairz	Won
Hair Stylist of the Year	Uganda	Mart Barber	Nominated
Hair Stylist of the Year	Uganda	Hair by Zziwa	Nominated
Hair Stylist of the Year	Uganda	Maureen Nambusi	Nominated
Hair Stylist of the Year	Uganda	Jeff Jingo	Nominated
Hair Stylist of the Year	Africa	Saadique Ryklief (South Africa)	Won
Hair Stylist of the Year	Africa	Rehema Samo (Tanzania)	Nominated
Hair Stylist of the Year	Africa	Saul Juma (Kenya)	Nominated
Hair Stylist of the Year	Africa	Ncumisa Mimiduma (South Africa)	Nominated
Makeup Artist of the Year	Uganda	Saida Beauty	Won
Makeup Artist of the Year	Uganda	Beats By Deryk	Nominated
Makeup Artist of the Year	Uganda	Danyel on the Brushes	Nominated
Makeup Artist of the Year	Uganda	Nahya Glam	Nominated
Makeup Artist of the Year	Uganda	Imani Makeup	Nominated
Makeup Artist of the Year	Africa	Lucoh Mhlongo (South Africa)	Nominated
Makeup Artist of the Year	Africa	Bimpe Onakoya (Nigeria)	Nominated
Makeup Artist of the Year	Africa	Muthoni Njoba (Kenya)	Nominated
Makeup Artist of the Year	Africa	Steve Koby (Kenya)	Nominated
Fashion Photographer of the year	Uganda	Oscar Ntege	Won
Fashion Photographer of the year	Uganda	Papa Shot it	Nominated
Fashion Photographer of the year	Uganda	Bwire Mark	Nominated
Fashion Photographer of the year	Uganda	Fred Bugembe	Nominated
Fashion Photographer of the year	Uganda	Daville	Nominated
Fashion Photographer of the year	Africa	Emmanuel Oyeleke (Nigeria)	Won
Fashion Photographer of the year	Africa	Trevor Stuurman (South Africa)	Nominated
Fashion Photographer of the year	Africa	Shawn Keiffer (Tanzania)	Nominated
Fashion Photographer of the year	Africa	Stevenchy Photography (Kenya)	Nominated
Fashion Photographer of the year	Africa	Justin Dingwall (South Africa)	Nominated
Fashion Stylist of the Year	Uganda	Tazibone Solomon	Won
Fashion Stylist of the Year	Uganda	Kaijuka Abbas	Nominated
Fashion Stylist of the Year	Uganda	Mavo Kampala	Nominated
Fashion Stylist of the Year	Uganda	Glitz by Nalu	Nominated
Fashion Stylist of the Year	Uganda	Sam Kikumba	Nominated
Fashion Stylist of the Year	Africa	Brian Babu (Kenya)	Won
Fashion Stylist of the Year	Africa	Chuck Mbevo (Angola)	Nominated
Fashion Stylist of the Year	Africa	Kelvin Vicent (Nigeria)	Nominated
Fashion Stylist of the Year	Africa	Moashy Styling (Nigeria)	Nominated
Fashion Stylist of the Year	Africa	Chloe Andrea (South Africa)	Nominated
Fashionable Music Video of the Year	Uganda	Chips Na Ketchup – Vinka	Won
Fashionable Music Video of the Year	Uganda	Finally – Geosteady	Nominated
Fashionable Music Video of the Year	Uganda	Very Well – King Saha, Slick Stuart and Roja	Nominated
Fashionable Music Video of the Year	Uganda	Mummy Yo – Sheebah Karungi	Nominated
Fashionable Music Video of the Year	Uganda	Mujje – GNL Zamba	Nominated
Fashionable Music Video of the Year	Africa	Duro Dada – Bimbi Phillips	Won
Fashionable Music Video of the Year	Africa	So Mi So – Wande Coal	Nominated
Fashionable Music Video of the Year	Africa	Sweetboy – Falz	Nominated
Fashionable Music Video of the Year	Africa	Short and Sweet -Sauti Sol	Nominated
Fashionable Music Video of the Year	Africa	Gbona – Burna Boy	Nominated
Fashion Writer of the Year	Uganda	Gloria Haguma	Won
Fashion Writer of the Year	Uganda	Esther Oluka	Nominated
Fashion Writer of the Year	Uganda	Nasif Nyiiro Nkoobe	Nominated
Fashion Writer of the Year	Uganda	Edward Nimusiima	Nominated
Fashion Writer of the Year	Uganda	Siima Sabiiti	Nominated
Fashion Writer of the Year	Africa	Eki Ogunbor (Nigeria)	Won
Fashion Writer of the Year	Africa	Patience Ezeogo (Style Vitae)	Nominated
Fashion Writer of the Year	Africa	Gloria Nella (Fashion Bomb Africa)	Nominated
Fashion Writer of the Year	Africa	Leanne Trcy (Refashion Africa)	Nominated
Fashion Writer of the Year	Africa	Richard Akuson (Anasty Boy)	Nominated
