= Abryanz Style and Fashion Awards 2019 =

Award Ceremony

- Awarded for: Seventh ASFA Awards
- Date: 13 December 2019
- Venue: Serena Hotel, Kampala
- Country: Uganda
- Hosted by: Vimbai Mutinhiri; Deedan
- Preshow host: Martha Kay
- Acts: Jidenna; Ozwald Boateng; David Tlale

Television/radio coverage
- Network: NTV Uganda

Abryanz Style and Fashion Awards 2019, themed The Stars, was the seventh edition of the Abryanz Style and Fashion Awards (ASFAs) that honored stars in the fashion industry in Africa. It was held on 13 December 2019 at the Kampala Serena Hotel in Kampala.

== Headliners ==
The three major headline acts were by American rapper, singer-songwriter and record producer Jidenna, British fashion designer Ozwald Boateng and South African fashion designer David Tlale. Jidenna had also been previously confirmed to perform at the Blankets and Wine Festival in Kampala on 15 December the same year.

Jidenna received the Icon Award and Boateng was awarded with the Lifetime Achievement Award for infusing a trademark twist on classic British tailoring and bespoke style. Other honorary awards awarded that night were the Star Maker award awarded to Joram Muzira, Positive Change award to Susan Guerts and Special Recognition Award for Innovation awarded to Kayiira.

== History ==
Nominations were opened on 8 October 2019 and closed later that month and the list of nominees was released at a Fashionpreneur Summit and nomination party on 26 October 2019 in Kampala. Public voting for the nominees was opened on 11 November and ran up to 10 December. Like all previous events, the public vote would carry 30% and the ASFAs' panel vote would carry 70%. It was earlier announced that Jidenna and Ozwald Boateng would receive honorary awards of Star Icon Award and Lifetime Achievement Award respectively for their work in the fashion industry in Africa.

== Honorary awards ==
Award	Received by	Ref
Star Icon Award	Jidenna	
Lifetime Achievement Award	Ozwald Boateng	
Star Maker Award	Joram Muzira	
Positive Change Award	Susan Guerts	
Special Recognition Award for Innovation	Kayiira	

== Nominees and winners ==
Abryanz Style and Fashion Awards 2019 Nominees and Winners
Category	Region	Nominees	Result
Designer of the year	Uganda	Abbas Kaijuka	Won
Designer of the year	Uganda	Vence	Nominated
Designer of the year	Uganda	Sham Tyra	Nominated
Designer of the year	Uganda	Fatumah Asha	Nominated
Designer of the year	Uganda	Ipigogo (Monica Kansiime)	Nominated
Designer of the year	Africa	Ifeanyi Nwune (Nigeria)	Won
Designer of the year	Africa	Christie Brow (Ghana)	Nominated
Designer of the year	Africa	Thebe Magugu (South Africa)	Nominated
Designer of the year	Africa	Loza Maléombho (Côte d'Ivoire)	Nominated
Designer of the year	Africa	Sheria Ngowi (Tanzania)	Nominated
Outstanding Model of the year	Uganda	Aliet Sarah	Won
Outstanding Model of the year	Uganda	Aketch Joy Winnie	Nominated
Outstanding Model of the year	Uganda	Ayak Vernonica	Nominated
Outstanding Model of the year	Uganda	Anyon Asola	Nominated
Outstanding Model of the year	Uganda	Emaan Agwet	Nominated
Outstanding Model of the year	Uganda	Judith Heard	Nominated
Outstanding Model of the year	Africa	Shanelle Nyasiase (Kenya)	Won
Outstanding Model of the year	Africa	Adut Akech (South Sudan)	Nominated
Outstanding Model of the year	Africa	Anok Yai (South Sudan)	Nominated
Outstanding Model of the year	Africa	Victor Ndigwe (Nigeria)	Nominated
Outstanding Model of the year	Africa	Adonis Bosso (Ivory Coast)	Nominated
Outstanding Model of the year	Africa	Blesnya Minher (Angola)	Nominated
Most Stylish Male Artiste of the Year	Uganda	Fik Fameica	Won
Most Stylish Male Artiste of the Year	Uganda	Beenie Gunter	Nominated
Most Stylish Male Artiste of the Year	Uganda	Ykee Benda	Nominated
Most Stylish Male Artiste of the Year	Uganda	Grenade	Nominated
Most Stylish Male Artiste of the Year	Uganda	Chosen Blood	Nominated
Most Stylish Male Artiste of the Year	Uganda	B2C	Nominated
Most Stylish Male Artiste of the Year	Africa	Burna Boy (Nigeria)	Won
Most Stylish Male Artiste of the Year	Africa	H_ART the BAND	Nominated
Most Stylish Male Artiste of the Year	Africa	Riky Rick (South Africa)	Nominated
Most Stylish Male Artiste of the Year	Africa	Jux (Tanzania)	Nominated
Most Stylish Male Artiste of the Year	Africa	Fally Ipupa (DR Congo)	Nominated
Most Stylish Female Artiste of the Year	Uganda	Spice Diana	Won
Most Stylish Female Artiste of the Year	Uganda	Lydia Jazmine	Nominated
Most Stylish Female Artiste of the Year	Uganda	Vinka	Nominated
Most Stylish Female Artiste of the Year	Uganda	Pia Pounds	Nominated
Most Stylish Female Artiste of the Year	Uganda	Nina Roz	Nominated
Most Stylish Female Artiste of the Year	Uganda	Recho Rey	Nominated
Most Stylish Female Artiste of the Year	Africa	Souhila Ben Lachhab (Algeria)	Won
Most Stylish Female Artiste of the Year	Africa	Vanessa Mdee (Tanzania)	Nominated
Most Stylish Female Artiste of the Year	Africa	Tiwa Savage (Nigeria)	Nominated
Most Stylish Female Artiste of the Year	Africa	Boity Thulo (South Africa)	Nominated
Most Stylish Female Artiste of the Year	Africa	Muthoni Drummer Queen (Kenya)	Nominated
Most Stylish Female Artiste of the Year	Africa	Yemi Alade (Nigeria)	Nominated
Male Fashionista of the Year	Uganda	Alex Mugagga	Won
Male Fashionista of the Year	Uganda	Brandon Brandon	Nominated
Male Fashionista of the Year	Uganda	Muzodde Black	Nominated
Male Fashionista of the Year	Uganda	Sir Owen Dapper	Nominated
Male Fashionista of the Year	Uganda	Ashiraf Kayz	Nominated
Male Fashionista of the Year	Uganda	Dice Rich	Nominated
Male Fashionista of the Year	Africa	Calisah (Tanzania)	Nominated
Male Fashionista of the Year	Africa	Amar Jonathan (Kenya)	Nominated
Male Fashionista of the Year	Africa	Lourens Gebhardt (Namibia)	Nominated
Male Fashionista of the Year	Africa	Ajis Copela	Nominated
Male Fashionista of the Year	Africa	Noble Igwe (Nigeria)	Nominated
Female Fashionista of the Year	Uganda	Mwaj Ahmed	Nominated
Female Fashionista of the Year	Uganda	Debbie Kagisha	Nominated
Female Fashionista of the Year	Uganda	Kentie	Nominated
Female Fashionista of the Year	Uganda	Kamusiime Sharon	Nominated
Female Fashionista of the Year	Africa	Luthando Shosha (South Africa)	Nominated
Female Fashionista of the Year	Africa	Nana Akua Addo (Ghana)	Nominated
Female Fashionista of the Year	Africa	Elizabeth Michael (Tanzania)	Nominated
Female Fashionista of the Year	Africa	Julie Olanipekun (Nigeria)	Nominated
Hair Stylist of the Year	Uganda	Ice Kenny	Won
Hair Stylist of the Year	Uganda	Hair Zipper	Nominated
Hair Stylist of the Year	Uganda	Jeff Jjingo	Nominated
Hair Stylist of the Year	Uganda	AFROS & Mo	Nominated
Hair Stylist of the Year	Uganda	Mirrors	Nominated
Hair Stylist of the Year	Uganda	Am Her Styling UG	Nominated
Hair Stylist of the Year	Africa	Corrine Muthoni (Kenya)	Won
Hair Stylist of the Year	Africa	Suzy Oludde (Nigeria)	Nominated
Hair Stylist of the Year	Africa	Rick Kish (Kenya)	Nominated
Hair Stylist of the Year	Africa	Ncumisa Mimiduma (South Africa)	Nominated
Hair Stylist of the Year	Africa	Saul Juma (Kenya)	Nominated
Makeup Artist of the Year	Uganda	Nahya Glam	Won
Makeup Artist of the Year	Uganda	Saida Beauty	Nominated
Makeup Artist of the Year	Uganda	Danyel on the Brushes	Nominated
Makeup Artist of the Year	Uganda	Shillat Mua	Nominated
Makeup Artist of the Year	Uganda	Imani Makeup	Nominated
Makeup Artist of the Year	Uganda	Umuhoza256	Nominated
Makeup Artist of the Year	Africa	Lavie Makeup (Tanzania)	Won
Makeup Artist of the Year	Africa	Valerie Lawson (Ghana)	Nominated
Makeup Artist of the Year	Africa	Banke Meshida Lawal (Nigeria)	Nominated
Makeup Artist of the Year	Africa	Lucoh Mhlongo	Nominated
Fashion Photographer of the year	Uganda	Walter Keys	Won
Fashion Photographer of the year	Uganda	Hans Shots	Nominated
Fashion Photographer of the year	Uganda	Tado Photography	Nominated
Fashion Photographer of the year	Uganda	Bwire Mark	Nominated
Fashion Photographer of the year	Uganda	Ninno Jack Jr.	Nominated
Fashion Photographer of the year	Uganda	Manzi Rolland	Nominated
Fashion Photographer of the year	Africa	Andile Mthembu (South Africa)	Won
Fashion Photographer of the year	Africa	Patrice De Lemos (Angola)	Nominated
Fashion Photographer of the year	Africa	Shane Costt (Rwanda)	Nominated
Fashion Photographer of the year	Africa	Twins DNT Beg(Ghana)	Nominated
Fashion Photographer of the year	Africa	Emmanuel Oyeleke (Nigeria)	Nominated
Fashion Photographer of the year	Africa	Brian Gathu (Kenya)	Nominated
Fashion Stylist of the Year	Uganda	Mavo Kampala	Won
Fashion Stylist of the Year	Uganda	Tazibone Solomon	Nominated
Fashion Stylist of the Year	Uganda	Trace De Lines	Nominated
Fashion Stylist of the Year	Uganda	Top Stylist	Nominated
Fashion Stylist of the Year	Uganda	Tinah Brad	Nominated
Fashion Stylist of the Year	Uganda	Sashz Closet	Nominated
Fashion Stylist of the Year	Africa	Chuck Mbevo (Angola)	Won
Fashion Stylist of the Year	Africa	Luxury Recycle (Mozambique)	Nominated
Fashion Stylist of the Year	Africa	Rusty Beukes (South Africa)	Nominated
Fashion Stylist of the Year	Africa	J Reason (Nigeria)	Nominated
Fashion Stylist of the Year	Africa	Daniel Obasi (Nigeria)	Nominated
Fashionable Music Video of the Year	Uganda	Sunday - Slick Stuart & Dj Roja Ft Allan Toniks	Won
Fashionable Music Video of the Year	Uganda	Gutujja - Rema Ft B2C	Nominated
Fashionable Music Video of the Year	Uganda	Sure - Vinka	Nominated
Fashionable Music Video of the Year	Uganda	Signal - Eddy Kenzo	Nominated
Fashionable Music Video of the Year	Uganda	Jangu Ondabe - Spice Diana	Nominated
Fashionable Music Video of the Year	Africa	Pull Up – Burna Boy (Nigeria)	Won
Fashionable Music Video of the Year	Africa	49-99 – Tiwa Savage (Nigeria)	Nominated
Fashionable Music Video of the Year	Africa	Supernova – Mr Eazi (Nigeria)	Nominated
Fashionable Music Video of the Year	Africa	Moyo – Vanessa Mdee (Tanzania)	Nominated
Fashionable Music Video of the Year	Africa	Extravaganza -Sauti Sol	Nominated
Fashionable Music Video of the Year	Africa	Whipped – Tellaman, Shekhina, Nasty C (South Africa)	Nominated
Fashion Media Excellence Award	Uganda	Gloria Haguma	Won
Fashion Media Excellence Award	Uganda	Esther Oluka	Nominated
Fashion Media Excellence Award	Uganda	Fashion Pit	Nominated
Fashion Media Excellence Award	Uganda	Edward Nimusiima	Nominated
Fashion Media Excellence Award	Africa	Bella Naija Style (Nigeria)	Won
Fashion Media Excellence Award	Africa	Style Rave	Nominated
Fashion Media Excellence Award	Africa	Style Vitae	Nominated
Fashion Media Excellence Award	Africa	Fashion Bomb Africa	Nominated
