= Abryanz Style and Fashion Awards 2017 =

African fashion award ceremony in Kampala

2017 Abryanz Style and Fashion Awards
- Awarded for: Recognizing excellence in fashion across Africa
- Date: 8 December 2017
- Venue: Kampala Serena Hotel
- Country: Uganda
- Hosted by: Rachel K; Nana Akua
- Preshow hosts: Brian Ahumuza; Bettinah Tianah; Joram Muzira
- Acts: Mafikizolo; Eddy Kenzo; Desire Luzinda; Fik Fameica; Gravity Omutujju; Latinum; Sheebah
- Website: https://abryanzstyleandfashionawards.com

Television/radio coverage
- Network: NTV Uganda
- Produced by: David Tlale

The Abryanz Style and Fashion Awards 2017 was held on 8 December 2017 at the Kampala Serena Hotel themed the Fashion Takeover, celebrating the business and entrepreneurial potential of the fashion industry in Africa. The awards were presented by the Abryanz franchise with the aim of honoring and celebrating the excellence of Africa's growing fashion industry. The event was hosted by Rachel K and Nana Akua and produced by South Africas's David Tlale.

Nominations for the 2017 ASFAs started on 7 September until 6 October. Nominees were unveiled in a video presented by Abryanz Collection and ASFAs CEO Brian Ahumuza, TV presenter Bettinah Tianah and model scout Joram Muzira.

== Acts ==
Musicians Mafikizolo, Eddy Kenzo, Desire Luzinda, Fik Fameica, Gravity Omutujju, Latinum and Sheebah performed at the event. Mafikizolo performed their hit songs including Wepuuti, Koona and closed their performance with their new release Love Potion which won Most Stylish Video of The Year award on the same night. The highlight of the event was the Lifetime/Style Fashion Icon Achievement Award which was presented to Nigerian tailor and fashion designer Mai Atafo.

== Nominees and winners ==
Winners are highlighted and bolded.

Abryanz Style and Fashion Awards Nominees and Winners
Category	Region	Nominees	Result
Lifestyle/Style Fashion Icon Achievement Award		Mai Atafo	Won
Designer of the year	Uganda	Ras Kasozi	Won
Designer of the year	Uganda	Fatuma Asha	Nominated
Designer of the year	Uganda	Anita Beryl	Nominated
Designer of the year	Uganda	Sham Tyra	Nominated
Designer of the year	Uganda	Joe Malaika	Nominated
Designer of the year	Continental (Africa)	Sheria Ngowi (Tanzania)	Won
Designer of the year	Continental (Africa)	Eric Raisina (Madagascar)	Nominated
Designer of the year	Continental (Africa)	Maki Oh (Nigeria)	Nominated
Designer of the year	Continental (Africa)	Zeddie Loky (Kenya)	Nominated
Designer of the year	Continental (Africa)	Quiteria & George (South Africa)	Nominated
Male Model of the year	Uganda	Bradley Paul	Won
Male Model of the year	Uganda	Troy Elimu	Nominated
Male Model of the year	Uganda	Danny Mbabazi	Nominated
Male Model of the year	Uganda	Housen Mushema	Nominated
Male Model of the year	Continental (Africa)	Pabz Nashua (South Africa)	Won
Male Model of the year	Continental (Africa)	Toyin Oyeneye (Nigeria)	Nominated
Male Model of the year	Continental (Africa)	Dave J Kabamba (Congo)	Nominated
Male Model of the year	Continental (Africa)	Kwen Maye (Kenya-Nigeria)	Nominated
Female Model of the year	Uganda	Anyola Anyon Asola	Won
Female Model of the year	Uganda	Angelo Keji Sarah	Nominated
Female Model of the year	Uganda	Aliet Sarah	Nominated
Female Model of the year	Uganda	Ayak Veronica	Nominated
Female Model of the year	Continental (Africa)	Shanelle Nyasiase (Kenya)	Won
Female Model of the year	Continental (Africa)	Opeyemi Awoyemi (Nigeria)	Nominated
Female Model of the year	Continental (Africa)	Giannina Oteto (Kenya)	Nominated
Female Model of the year	Continental (Africa)	Aminat Ayinde (Nigeria)	Nominated
Male Most Stylish/Dressed Celebrity	Uganda	Aleecool	Won
Male Most Stylish/Dressed Celebrity	Uganda	Zipper Atafo	Nominated
Male Most Stylish/Dressed Celebrity	Uganda	Dj Roja& slick stuart	Nominated
Male Most Stylish/Dressed Celebrity	Uganda	Alex Muhangi	Nominated
Male Most Stylish/Dressed Celebrity	Uganda	Adams Ddumba	Nominated
Male Most Stylish/Dressed Celebrity	Continental (Africa)	Idris Sultan (Tanzania)	Won
Male Most Stylish/Dressed Celebrity	Continental (Africa)	Aphrican Ape( Dami Olatunde) (Nigeria)	Nominated
Male Most Stylish/Dressed Celebrity	Continental (Africa)	Toosweet Annan (Ghana	Nominated
Male Most Stylish/Dressed Celebrity	Continental (Africa)	Emmanuel Ikubese (Nigeria)	Nominated
Female Most Stylish/Dressed Celebrity	Uganda	Judith Heard	Won
Female Most Stylish/Dressed Celebrity	Uganda	Natasha Sinayobye	Nominated
Female Most Stylish/Dressed Celebrity	Uganda	Sylvia Namutebi	Nominated
Female Most Stylish/Dressed Celebrity	Uganda	Crystal Newman	Nominated
Female Most Stylish/Dressed Celebrity	Uganda	Pherrie Kimbugwe	Nominated
Female Most Stylish/Dressed Celebrity	Continental (Africa)	Nana Akua Addo (Ghana)	Won
Female Most Stylish/Dressed Celebrity	Continental (Africa)	Toke Makinwa (Nigeria)	Nominated
Female Most Stylish/Dressed Celebrity	Continental (Africa)	Moozlie (South Africa)	Nominated
Female Most Stylish/Dressed Celebrity	Continental (Africa)	Ilwad Elman(Somalia)	Nominated
Female Most Stylish/Dressed Celebrity	Continental (Africa)	Lulu Michael (Tanzania)	Nominated
Most Stylish Male Artiste	Uganda	Bebe Cool	Won
Most Stylish Male Artiste	Uganda	Baliruno K. Hanson	Nominated
Most Stylish Male Artiste	Uganda	Fik Fameica	Nominated
Most Stylish Male Artiste	Uganda	Ykee Benda	Nominated
Most Stylish Male Artiste	Uganda	B2C	Nominated
Most Stylish Male Artiste	Uganda	Exodus	Nominated
Most Stylish Male Artiste	Continental (Africa)	Sauti Sol (Kenya)	Won
Most Stylish Male Artiste	Continental (Africa)	Mr Eazi (Ghana)	Nominated
Most Stylish Male Artiste	Continental (Africa)	Wizkid (Nigeria)	Nominated
Most Stylish Male Artiste	Continental (Africa)	Runtown (Nigeria)	Nominated
Most Stylish Male Artiste	Continental (Africa)	Riky Rick (South Africa)	Nominated
Most Stylish Female Artiste	Uganda	Sheebah	Won
Most Stylish Female Artiste	Uganda	Desire Luzinda	Nominated
Most Stylish Female Artiste	Uganda	Nina Roz	Nominated
Most Stylish Female Artiste	Uganda	Lydia Jazmine	Nominated
Most Stylish Female Artiste	Uganda	Spice Diana	Nominated
Most Stylish Female Artiste	Continental (Africa)	Tiwa Savage (Nigeria)	Won
Most Stylish Female Artiste	Continental (Africa)	Yemi Alade (Nigeria)	Nominated
Most Stylish Female Artiste	Continental (Africa)	Nsoki Neto (Angola)	Nominated
Most Stylish Female Artiste	Continental (Africa)	Nadia Nakai (South Africa)	Nominated
Most Stylish Female Artiste	Continental (Africa)	Vanessa Mdee (Tanzania)	Nominated
Best Male Dressed Media Personality	Uganda	Denzel Mwiyeretsi	Won
Best Male Dressed Media Personality	Uganda	Joel Khamadi	Nominated
Best Male Dressed Media Personality	Uganda	Solomon Serwanja	Nominated
Best Male Dressed Media Personality	Uganda	Edwin Musiime	Nominated
Best Male Dressed Media Personality	Uganda	Calvin the entertainer	Nominated
Best Male Dressed Media Personality	Continental (Africa)	Jamal Gaddafi (Kenya)	Won
Best Male Dressed Media Personality	Continental (Africa)	Katleho Sinivasan (South Africa)	Nominated
Best Male Dressed Media Personality	Continental (Africa)	Uti Nwachukwu (Nigeria)	Nominated
Best Male Dressed Media Personality	Continental (Africa)	George Ndirangu (Rwanda)	Nominated
Best Male Dressed Media Personality	Continental (Africa)	Denola Grey (Nigeria)	Nominated
Best Female Dressed Media Personality	Uganda	Bettinah Tianah	Won
Best Female Dressed Media Personality	Uganda	Malaika Nnyanzi	Nominated
Best Female Dressed Media Personality	Uganda	Judithiana	Nominated
Best Female Dressed Media Personality	Uganda	Deedan Muyira	Nominated
Best Female Dressed Media Personality	Uganda	Maria Kibalizi	Nominated
Best Female Dressed Media Personality	Continental (Africa)	Anita Nderu (South Africa))	Won
Best Female Dressed Media Personality	Continental (Africa)	Stephanie Coker (Nigeria)	Nominated
Best Female Dressed Media Personality	Continental (Africa)	Nomzamo (South Africa)	Nominated
Best Female Dressed Media Personality	Continental (Africa)	Vimbai (Zimbabwe)	Nominated
Male Fashionista of the Year	Uganda	Abduz Spot	Won
Male Fashionista of the Year	Uganda	Handsome Allanlee	Nominated
Male Fashionista of the Year	Uganda	Ricky Mugenyi	Nominated
Male Fashionista of the Year	Uganda	Jacob Home of gents	Nominated
Male Fashionista of the Year	Uganda	Anthony Kays	Nominated
Male Fashionista of the Year	Continental (Africa)	Eddie Kirindo (Kenya)	Won
Male Fashionista of the Year	Continental (Africa)	Noble Igwe (Nigeria)	Nominated
Male Fashionista of the Year	Continental (Africa)	Prince Thabiso Mkhize (South Africa)	Nominated
Male Fashionista of the Year	Continental (Africa)	Josef Adamu (Nigeria)	Nominated
Male Fashionista of the Year	Continental (Africa)	Sir Abner (South Africa)	Nominated
Female Fashionista of the Year	Uganda	Rashidah Mwiza	Won
Female Fashionista of the Year	Uganda	Sasha Ferguson	Nominated
Female Fashionista of the Year	Uganda	Aaron Hilson	Nominated
Female Fashionista of the Year	Uganda	Cynthia Nakiranda	Nominated
Female Fashionista of the Year	Uganda	Sandrah Lexy	Nominated
Female Fashionista of the Year	Continental (Africa)	Stefani Roma (Kenya)	Won
Female Fashionista of the Year	Continental (Africa)	Sharon Ojong (Nigeria)	Nominated
Female Fashionista of the Year	Continental (Africa)	Antonia Shinana (Namibia)	Nominated
Female Fashionista of the Year	Continental (Africa)	Didi Olomide (Congo)	Nominated
Female Fashionista of the Year	Continental (Africa)	Hamisa Mobeto (Tanzania)	Nominated
Hair Stylist of the Year	Uganda	Nambuusi Maureen	Won
Hair Stylist of the Year	Uganda	Grace Warren	Nominated
Hair Stylist of the Year	Uganda	Hair by Zziwa	Nominated
Hair Stylist of the Year	Uganda	Freddie	Nominated
Hair Stylist of the Year	Continental (Africa)	Saul Juma (Kenya)	Won
Hair Stylist of the Year	Continental (Africa)	Saadique Ryklief (South Africa)	Nominated
Hair Stylist of the Year	Continental (Africa)	Corrine Muthoni (Kenya)	Nominated
Hair Stylist of the Year	Continental (Africa)	Ncumisa Mimi Duma (South Africa)	Nominated
Makeup Artist of the Year	Uganda	Mona Faces	Won
Makeup Artist of the Year	Uganda	Nahya Shero	Nominated
Makeup Artist of the Year	Uganda	Imani Makeup	Nominated
Makeup Artist of the Year	Uganda	Faith Presh	Nominated
Makeup Artist of the Year	Uganda	Derrick Ssekamate	Nominated
Makeup Artist of the Year	Continental (Africa)	Marco Louis (South Africa)	Won
Makeup Artist of the Year	Continental (Africa)	Anita Brows (Nigeria)	Nominated
Makeup Artist of the Year	Continental (Africa)	Kangai Mwiti (Kenya)	Nominated
Makeup Artist of the Year	Continental (Africa)	Nancy Blaq (Ghana)	Nominated
Makeup Artist of the Year	Continental (Africa)	NYW makeup(Angola)	Nominated
Fashion photographer of the year	Uganda	Oscar Ntege	Won
Fashion photographer of the year	Uganda	Oneal Mujjumbura	Nominated
Fashion photographer of the year	Uganda	Fred Bugembe	Nominated
Fashion photographer of the year	Uganda	Daville	Nominated
Fashion photographer of the year	Uganda	Mohsen Taha	Nominated
Fashion photographer of the year	Continental (Africa)	Rezebonna (South Africa)	Won
Fashion photographer of the year	Continental (Africa)	Kudzai King (Zimbabwe)	Nominated
Fashion photographer of the year	Continental (Africa)	Trevor Stuurman (South Africa)	Nominated
Fashion photographer of the year	Continental (Africa)	Shawn Kieffer (Tanzania- South Africa)	Nominated
Fashion photographer of the year	Continental (Africa)	Kuyoh Photography (Kenya)	Nominated
Stylist of the Year	Uganda	Tinah Brad	Won
Stylist of the Year	Uganda	Tazibone Solomon	Nominated
Stylist of the Year	Uganda	Abbas Kaijuka	Nominated
Stylist of the Year	Uganda	Mavo Kampala	Nominated
Stylist of the Year	Continental (Africa)	Swanky Jerry (Nigeria)	Won
Stylist of the Year	Continental (Africa)	Brian Babu (Kenya)	Nominated
Stylist of the Year	Continental (Africa)	Chuck Mbevo (Angola)	Nominated
Stylist of the Year	Continental (Africa)	Kwena Baloyi (South Africa)	Nominated
Stylist of the Year	Continental (Africa)	Reinhard Mahalie (Namibia)	Nominated
Fashionable Music Video of the Year	Uganda	Jubilation- Eddy Kenzo	Won
Fashionable Music Video of the Year	Uganda	Stylo – Vinka	Nominated
Fashionable Music Video of the Year	Uganda	I'm Still Here – Juliana Kanyomozi	Nominated
Fashionable Music Video of the Year	Uganda	Wololo- David Lutalo	Nominated
Fashionable Music Video of the Year	Uganda	The way- Sheebah	Nominated
Fashionable Music Video of the Year	Continental (Africa)	Love portion – Mafikizolo	Won
Fashionable Music Video of the Year	Continental (Africa)	Juice- YCEE & Maleek Berry	Nominated
Fashionable Music Video of the Year	Continental (Africa)	Mad over you – Runtown	Nominated
Fashionable Music Video of the Year	Continental (Africa)	Particular – DJ Maphorisa	Nominated
Fashionable Music Video of the Year	Continental (Africa)	Love again – C4 Pedro ft Sauti Sol	Nominated
Fashion Blogger / Writer of the Year	Uganda	Satisfashion UG	Won
Fashion Blogger / Writer of the Year	Uganda	Amarachi Grace	Nominated
Fashion Blogger / Writer of the Year	Uganda	Lamic Kirabo	Nominated
Fashion Blogger / Writer of the Year	Uganda	Samson Baranga	Nominated
Fashion Blogger / Writer of the Year	Uganda	Gloria Haguma	Nominated
Fashion Blogger / Writer of the Year	Uganda	Shalom Nicolette	Nominated
Fashion Blogger / Writer of the Year	Continental (Africa)	Silvia Njoki (Kenya)	Won
Fashion Blogger / Writer of the Year	Continental (Africa)	Ono Bello (Nigeria)	Nominated
Fashion Blogger / Writer of the Year	Continental (Africa)	Joy Kendi (Kenya)	Nominated
Fashion Blogger / Writer of the Year	Continental (Africa)	Ghana fashion marketing (Ghana)	Nominated
