= Cathy Patra =

Ugandan dancer

- Born: Catherine Mbabazi; October 3, 1992 (age 33); Nsambya Kampala
- Citizenship: Uganda
- Education: Old Kampala Primary School, Mbarara Army Boarding Secondary School (MABSS), Bombo Secondary School; Ndejje University; (Certificate in Accounting and Finance); (Bachelor of Business Administration)
- Occupations: Dancer, Choreographer, Fashion model, businesswoman
- Years active: 2014
- Awards: Best Choreography in Africa award at the 2021 Zikomo Awards in Zambia; her group RVC won Best Dancing Group in Africa at the 2021 Zikomo Awards in Zambia; Best Dressed Female on East Africa Fashion Awards Blue Carpet 2020; Best Female Dancer Sweet Heart Awards 2016.
- Career
- Current group: RVC

Catherine Mbabazi commonly known as Cathy Patra is a Ugandan dancer, choreographer, fashion model and businesswoman. She won the Best Choreography in Africa award and her group RVC won Best Dancing Group in Africa at the 2021 Zikomo Awards in Zambia.

== Life and career ==
Cathy Patra was born in Nsambya Hospital to Mr.Mwesigwa Emmanuel and Mrs. Mwesigwa Rose. She is the fourth of the six children in her family. She went to Old Kampala Primary School, Mbarara Army Boarding Secondary School(MABSS) for her O Level, then Bombo Secondary School for A Level. She then attended Ndejje University and did a Certificate in accounting and Finance and then upgraded to Bachelor of Business Administration. She started dancing in her earliest teenage years at family gatherings and school before joining a professional church group called Miracle Teens at Miracle Centre Church in 2004. In 2014, she founded her own dance group called RVC. She soon afterwards co-owned The Fix Cosmetics in Kampala with Georgine Komuhendo, then Red Events Ltd with Sheebah Karungi and a number of other businesses in Kampala.

She used dance to showcase issues woman face in our society for example access to education, inequality at work places, domestic violence, skills and knowledge empowerment, sexual harassment in the entertainment industry at Nation Theatre Uganda in a dance production titled I am Female. She has choreographed for Sheebah, Rema and Spice Diana.

== Nominations and awards ==
Patra won the Best Choreographer in Africa award and her dance group RVC won Best Dancing Group in Africa at Zikomo Awards in Zambia in 2021. Best Dressed Female on East Africa Fashion Awards Blue Carpet 2020, Best Female Dancer Sweet Heart Awards 2016.

== Discography ==
Year	Video/Concert	Artist
2014	Go Down Low	Sheebah Karungi and Pallaso
2016	By the way	Sheebah Karungi
2017	Enjala	Sheebah Karungi

== See also ==
- Dance in Uganda
- Ugandan women in the arts
- Contemporary dance in Africa
- Zikomo Africa Awards
- Sheebah Karungi
- Rema Namakula
- Spice Diana
