= Gilmore Tee =

Zimbabwean Media Practitioner

- Born: Gilmore Qhawe Khumalo; 21 March 1990 (age 36); Bulawayo, Zimbabwe
- Occupations: Media Practitioner, Curator and Cultural Manager; MTV Shuga Representative
- Organization: Paper Bag Africa
- Known for: Writing for GQ South Africa & Glamour Magazine SA
- Notable work: Founder & Curator of The PiChani
- Television: TV Host & Producer - Thatha Wena (ZBC TV)

Gilmore Tee (born Gilmore Qhawe Khumalo) is a Zimbabwean Media Practitioner, Curator, Cultural Manager and Fashionista. In 2019 he was listed among Forbes Africa's 30 under 30. Gilmore writes for Conde Nast GQ South Africa and Glamour Magazine South Africa. He is also the Founder and Curator of The PiChani, a PAN African lifestyle and cross-networking platform which integrates young entrepreneurs, leaders and achievers, from finance, creative, agriculture, civic, tourism, medical, technology, diplomatic and sports industries. It's the biggest dress-up event in Zimbabwe, hosted in Bulawayo, Zimbabwe.

== Background ==
Gilmore was born in Bulawayo, Zimbabwe where he grew up. He attended early education at McKeurtan Primary School. He continued his high school at Gifford High School and St Gabriel's College. He then proceeded to doing a Higher Diploma in French with CIEP – Centre International d’Etudes Pedagogiques under the Alliance Française, graduating in 2011. He later went on to doing Development Studies with the National University of Science and Technology.

Gilmore started his career in media at the age of 17 year as a Newsletter Editor for the Radio Dialogue Youth Press Bureau. In 2007, he was published in an Anthology by Mthwakazi Arts Festival, leading to him joining British Council's Echoes Of Young Voices Group in 2008. In 2009, Gilmore was selected to represent Zimbabwe at the Global Youth Summit in the UK, a program by British Council. On coming back to Zimbabwe, he founded Deck Magazine alongside ETV Scandals’ Actress Mbo Mahocs, Chris Nqoe, Ntando Van Moyo and Sonny Jermain.

In 2014, Gilmore started a content creation and public relations company called Hunnar Management Agency, which then later rebranded in 2017 and became Paper Bag Africa. Gilmore started writing for Conde Nasts’ GQ South Africa & Glamour South Africa in 2017. Prio, he was a columnist at The Standard Newspaper and also hosted a weekly radio show with South Africa's CliffCentral. In 2020 to 2021, he was the Zimbabwean representative for the MTV Africa Music Awards and also hosted the red carpet in 2016, 2017 and returned in 2022 as a host and Co-Producer of the Red Carpet at Zimbabwe Music Awards.

Gilmore is a Licensee for MTV Staying Alive Foundation, involved in distributing the content for the HIV/AIDS awareness television and radio show, MTV Shuga. Gilmore was the Host & Producer of Award Nominated Prime Time television show, Thatha Wena which aired on Zimbabwe Broadcasting Cooperation. In 2018, Gilmore became the Festival Coordinator for the European Film Festival Zimbabwe which was established by the European Union Delegation. SInce then he has been Co-Curating programs and coordinating the European Film Festival in Zimbabwe. He resigned from his post in October 2023. In the year 2019, Gilmore Founded & Curated The PiChani, a PAN African lifestyle and cross-networking platform that integrates young entrepreneurs, leaders and achievers, from finance, creative, agriculture, civic, tourism, medical, technology, diplomatic and sports industries. Yearly, The PiChani gathers a group of 200 of the above-mentioned, for an exclusive INVITE ONLY evening event with performances, showcases, food, drinks and exhibitions. The PiChani has been attended by Award Winning South African Influencer - Mihlali Ndamase, Award Winning Media Personality - Luthanda "LootLove" Shosha, Editor-in-Chief for Glamour Magazine - South Africa, Nontando Mposo, ZiFM Stereo Radio Host - MisRed and South African Fashion Designer - Mzukisi Mbane. The PiChani has since partnered with Liquor Supplies, African Sun, FastJet, Jameson Irish Whiskey, Habakkuk Trust, Khanondo Travel & Tours, Paper Bag Africa and Three Monkeys Wine. In 2021, the event had a digital footprint of 5 Million, increasing to 15 Million in 2022.

In 2021, Gilmore founded - eMoyeni Digital Storytelling, a project aimed at equipping content creators with skills on how best they can navigate the digital space to reach larger numbers with their content. The initiative has benefitted over 100 content creators who have been part of the 2 cohorts of participants. It has linked them to industry players such as Aljazeera's - Imran Garda, Media Personality - Vimbai Mutinhiri, US Based Actress - Sibongile Mlambo, and Editor-in-Chief for GQ South Africa - Molife Kumona, amongst many. Through his partnership with British Council, Gilmore led a Research Project called I Wear My Culture ZW, which explored on 10 Zimbabwean and 2 UK ethnic groups, zoning on their traditional cultural attires, house decorations, body art, sustainable practices and unique colours. The research, which took over 8 months, involved 10 young designers traveling to the different ethnic groups' original locations to gather information. The end result of the project is 20 contemporary garments interpreting the findings, an award-winning fashion film and an award-winning documentary captured by Prosper and Nicole Kunyetu. The I Wear My Culture Documentary won the Outstanding Full Length TV Production award at the Bulawayo Arts Awards 2023 and also bagged a silver award at the International Tourism Film Festival Africa 2024. The documentary screened at the Bulawayo Arts Festival 2024, an initiative by the Bulawayo City Council. As part of I Wear My Culture, Gilmore released a look book featuring pictures taken by internationally acclaimed UK Based photographer - Val Juma.

In 2024, Gilmore was a speaker and panelist at the SoCreative Summit, Victoria Yards, Johannesburg, where he addressed "Cultural Heritage and Fashion Entrepreneurship" alongside regional creative leaders. He also featured as a speaker during the Culture Grows Symposium (2025)in Nairobi, Kenya hosted by British Council East Africa Arts, discussing the future of culture in a digital world. Gilmore was a Guest speaker at Global Fashion Graduate 2025 (South Africa), an initiative uniting over 20 universities from 10 countries to empower the next generation of designers. Additionally, at the Mozambique Fashion Forum, he led strategic debates on fashion production, distribution and export as an expert speaker for the forum team. Soon after speaking in Mozambique, Gilmore was a panelist at the Econet E-Novate Expo (2025), talking about the future of digital influence and branding in Harare, sharing the stage with Africa’s leading tech and creative voices.

== Recognition ==
- 6 Inspiring Young people - Global Youth Summit 2009
- Named one of the world's most influential young people - Eduzine (UK) 2013
- Style icon of the year - Zimbabwe Fashion Week Awards 2013
- Community Leader Award (Nomination) - IARS Research and Youth Leadership Awards 2015
- Male Fashionista of the Year (Nomination) - Abryanz Style and Fashion Awards 2016
- FORBES Africa 30 Under 30 young leaders of 2019
- GQ Best Dressed Men 2020
- Youngest Board Member of Culture Fund Zimbabwe
- Board Member of the Bulawayo Polytechnic Applied Art and Design School
- Former Vice President of the Alliance Francaise de Bulawayo Board
- Gilmore partners with Jameson Irish Whiskey Ambassador 2021 (#BuyOriginal)
- Provincial Judge (Bulawayo Metropolitan) - Miss Universe Zimbabwe 2022
- Gilmore Tee partners with FastJet (2023)
- Forty Under 40 Africa 2023 Winner
- Co-Curator & Coordinator of European Film Festival Zimbabwe (2018 - 2023)
- Lead Project Researcher, Creative Director & Curator of I Wear My Culture
- International Judge for Global Creative Graduate Showcase 2026, a prestigious initiative by ARTS THREAD in partnership with Google Arts & Culture
