= Kayondo =

Kayondo is a surname. Notable people with the surname include:

- Aziz Kayondo (born 2002), Ugandan footballer
- Hamu Kayondo (born 1990), Ugandan cricketer
- Leila Kayondo (born 1988), Ugandan musician
