= Sarah Langa =

South African influencer and entrepreneur (born 1993)

- Born: Sarah Nomalanga Heaton; February 26, 1993 (age 33); Soweto, South Africa
- Education: University of the Witwatersrand
- Occupations: Influencer; model; entrepreneur
- Height: 1.70 m (5 ft 7 in)

Sarah Nomalanga Heaton (born 26 February 1993), known professionally as Sarah Langa, is a South African social media personality, entrepreneur and model. She gained prominence through her self titled blog where she showcases luxury fashion, beauty, and travelling content. She is the founder of Luvant and Heaton Consulting. She was included in Africa’s Aficionados And Eclectic Collections list by Forbes in 2020.

== Career ==
Langa began her career in 2013, when she launched her first blog "HeatOnTheLine" which engage on travel, fashion and lifestyle. She rose to prominence where she started to work with several notable brands includes Picot & Moss, Brutal Fruit, Vince Camuto, Stylista, Witchery, Samsung, Nespresso, H&M and Woolworths (Style By SA campaign). In 2015, she was named the face of Woolworths Autumn/Winter15 campaign and became the brand ambassador of Picot & Miss. In 2016, she collaborated with global hair brand Design Essentials & Co Hair Essentials. She was nominated for the Abryanz Style and Fashion Awards for 2016 under Female Fashionista of the Year.

Langa was listed in Africa’s Aficionados And Their Eclectic Collections list by Forbes Africa in 2019. In 2023, she has appeared in Glamour magazine cover.

== Filmography ==
Year	Title	Role	Notes
2025–present	Bad Influencer	Herself	Recurring role

== Awards and nominations ==
Year	Association	Category	Nominated works	Result	Ref.
2016	Abryanz Style and Fashion Awards	Female Fashionista of the Year	Herself	Nominated	
2018	Glamour	Most Glamorous Class	Herself	Won	
2018	Abryanz Style and Fashion Awards	Female Fashionista of the Year	Herself	Won	
2019	2 Millions Icons Award	Instagramer of the Year	Herself	Won	
