= SK Mbuga =

Ugandan businessman (born 1983)

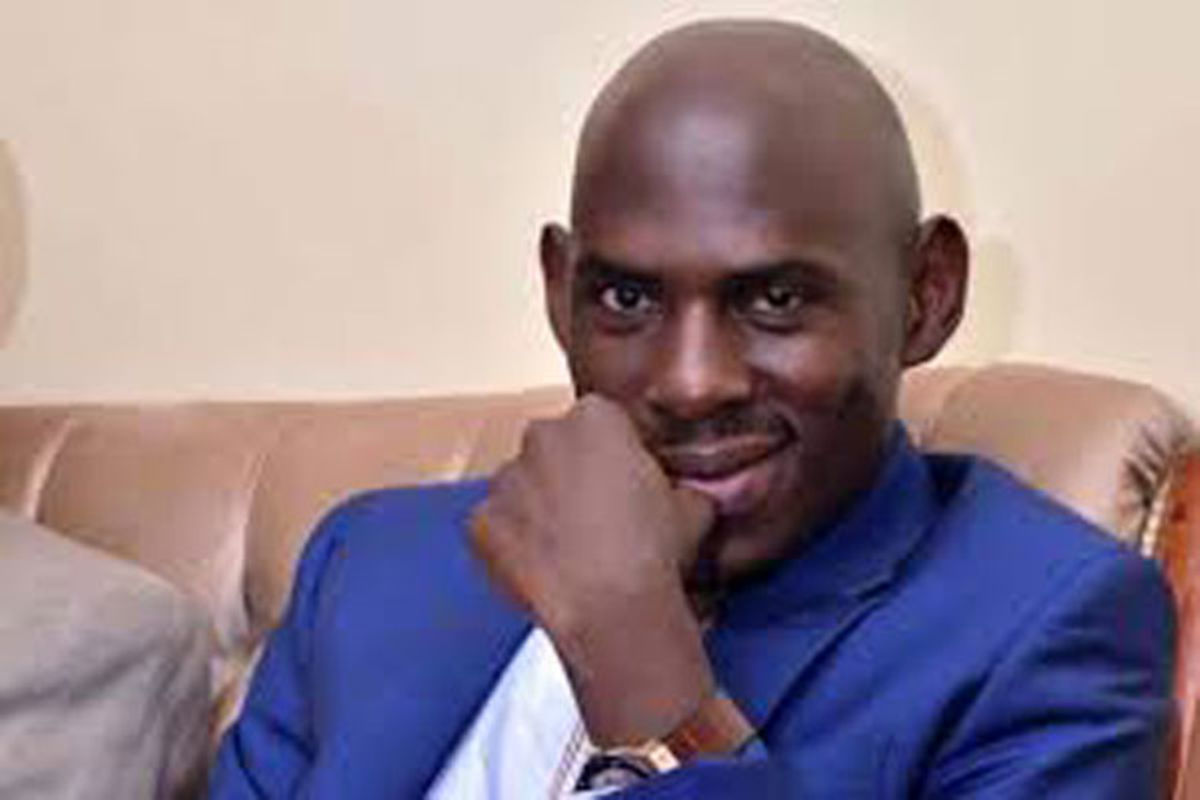
- Born: Sulaiman Kabangala Mbuga; February 14, 1983 (age 43); Masaka
- Citizenship: Ugandan
- Occupation: Businessman
- Years active: 2002–present
- Television: STV Uganda
- Title: Hajji

Sulaiman Kabangala Mbuga (born 14 February 1983) commonly known as SK Mbuga is a Ugandan businessman. He is the CEO of Atroks Security Services. He has been listed among the richest Ugandans..

== Early life and education ==
Mbuga was born on 14 February 1983 in Kimaanya region, Masaka, Uganda. He started his elementary education from Masaka, he then joined Bilal Islamic Primary school in Bwaise, Kampala. Mbuga later joined Masaka secondary school for his O-level. Mbuga left school and started hustling for money since he had young brothers and sisters to cater for due to fewer funds at home.

== Career ==
Mbuga started as a local small scale radio and television mechanic in Kyengera, Wakiso District, he later changed his profession to a video jockey in Kyengera town and Kisenyi region in Kampala. In 2002, he left for South Africa. In 2020, Mbuga started Select 4 Fun, a media company which consisted of a television station operating as STV Uganda.

== Personal life ==
Mbuga dated singer Leila Kayondo. In 2017, he married Vivienne Chebet. He lives in Buziga, Uganda, with his children.

In 2018, Interpol arrested Mbuga in connection with 53m kronor (about 23 billion Ugandan shillings) and in 2019, he and his wife were remanded to Luzira prison on fraud charges. After being moved to Denmark, a Swedish court found him not guilty due to lack of evidence.
