= Sheebah Karungi =

Ugandan recording artist

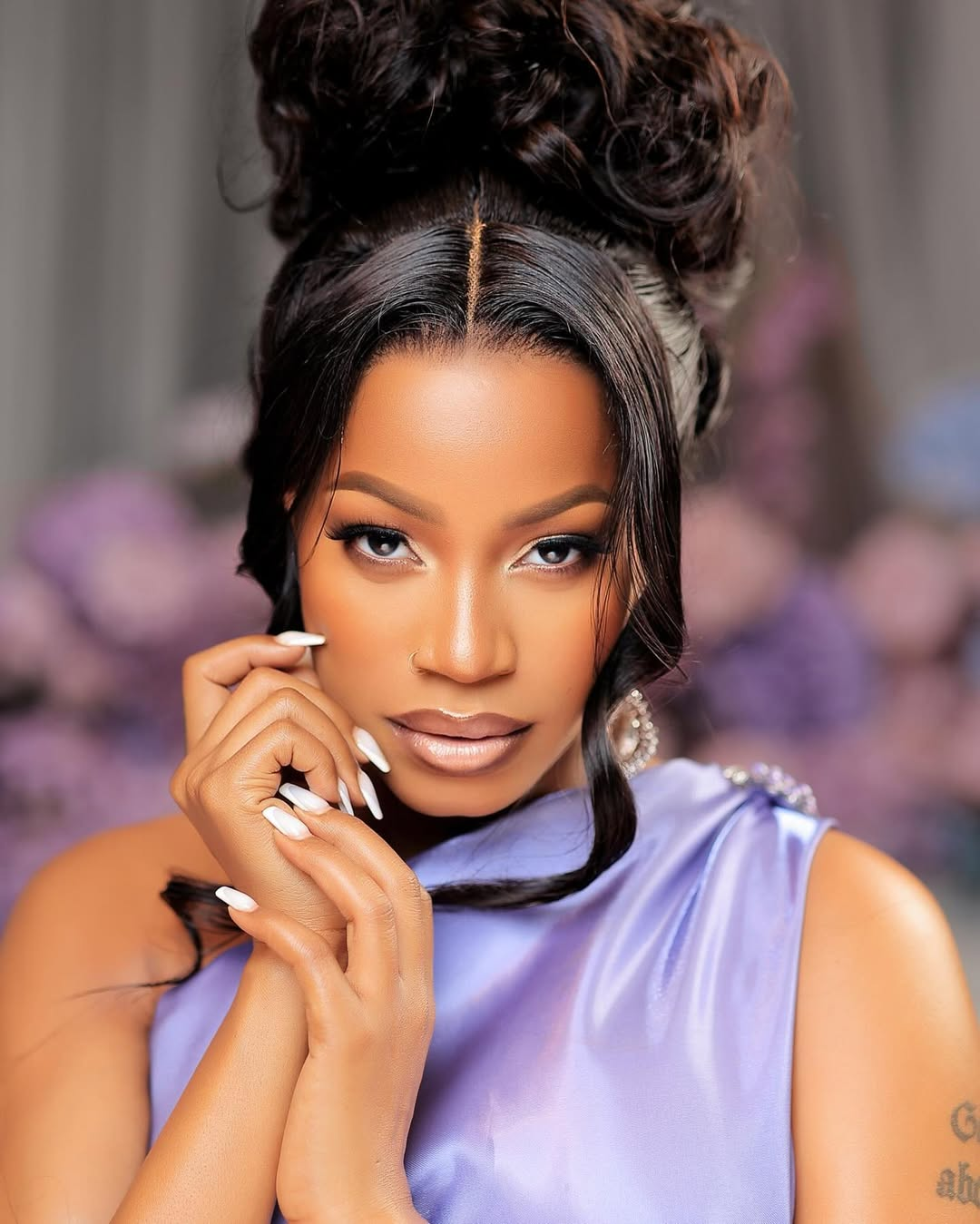
- Sheebah in 2024

Background information
- Also known as: Queen Karma, Sheebah
- Born: Samali Karungi; 11 November 1989 (age 36); Kawempe, Kampala, Uganda
- Origin: Kawempe, Kampala, Uganda
- Genres: Rhythm and blues, Dancehall
- Occupations: Musician, dancer, actress, businessperson
- Years active: 2006–present
- Label: Karma music
- Formerly of: Team No Sleep (TNS)

Sheebah Karungi (born on 11 November, 1989), Commonly known as "Queen Karma", and Sheebah, is a Ugandan musician, dancer, actress and feminist activist.

She debuted her acting career in Queen of Katwe as Shakira. After quitting Obsessions, a dance group she joined in 2006, she started making music and later rose to fame and she was recognised after the release of her hit single "Ice Cream". In 2014, she released her debut project Ice Cream, a five-track EP which did well commercially and led her to win back-to-back HiPipo Music Awards Best Female Artist in 2015, 2016, 2017, 2018, 2019, 2020, 2021, 2022, 2023, and 2024. She also won the Artist of the Year award twice, in 2017, 2018, and 2019 at the HiPipo Music Awards. In 2024, she was appointed vice president of the Uganda National Musician Federation assisting Eddy Kenzo who is the president of the federation.

== Early life and education ==
Sheebah Karungi was born on 11 November, 1989 and raised by a single mother Edith Kabazungu in Kawempe, a division of Kampala district. After completing her basic education at Kawempe Muslim Primary School, she dropped out of school in senior two when she was a student of Midland High School, Kawempe.

== Career ==
At the age of 15, Sheebah started dancing for money after she joined a dance group called Stingers before she left the group for Obsessions Music Group in 2006. At Obsessions she developed an interest in music, recording two songs before she left the group for a solo career in music.

In 2010, Sheebah released "Kunyenyenza", her first official single, produced by Washington. She went on to release another song titled "Bulikyenkola", featuring vocals from KS Alpha and Prince Fahim and then "Baliwa" featuring Coco Finger. It was until she released "Automatic", a song written by Sizzaman, that her solo career experienced a major turnaround. Upon the success of "Automatic", she teamed up again with Sizzaman to release "Ice Cream" to massive airplay and positive reviews before she went on to release another hit single, "Twesana".

In 2014, she released her first musical project, Ice Cream, a five-track EP which contained hit singles including "Ice Cream" and "Jordan". The EP was well received and helped win her Best Female Artist at the 2014 and 2015 HiPipo Music Awards.

Sheebah's second project was titled Nkwatako.

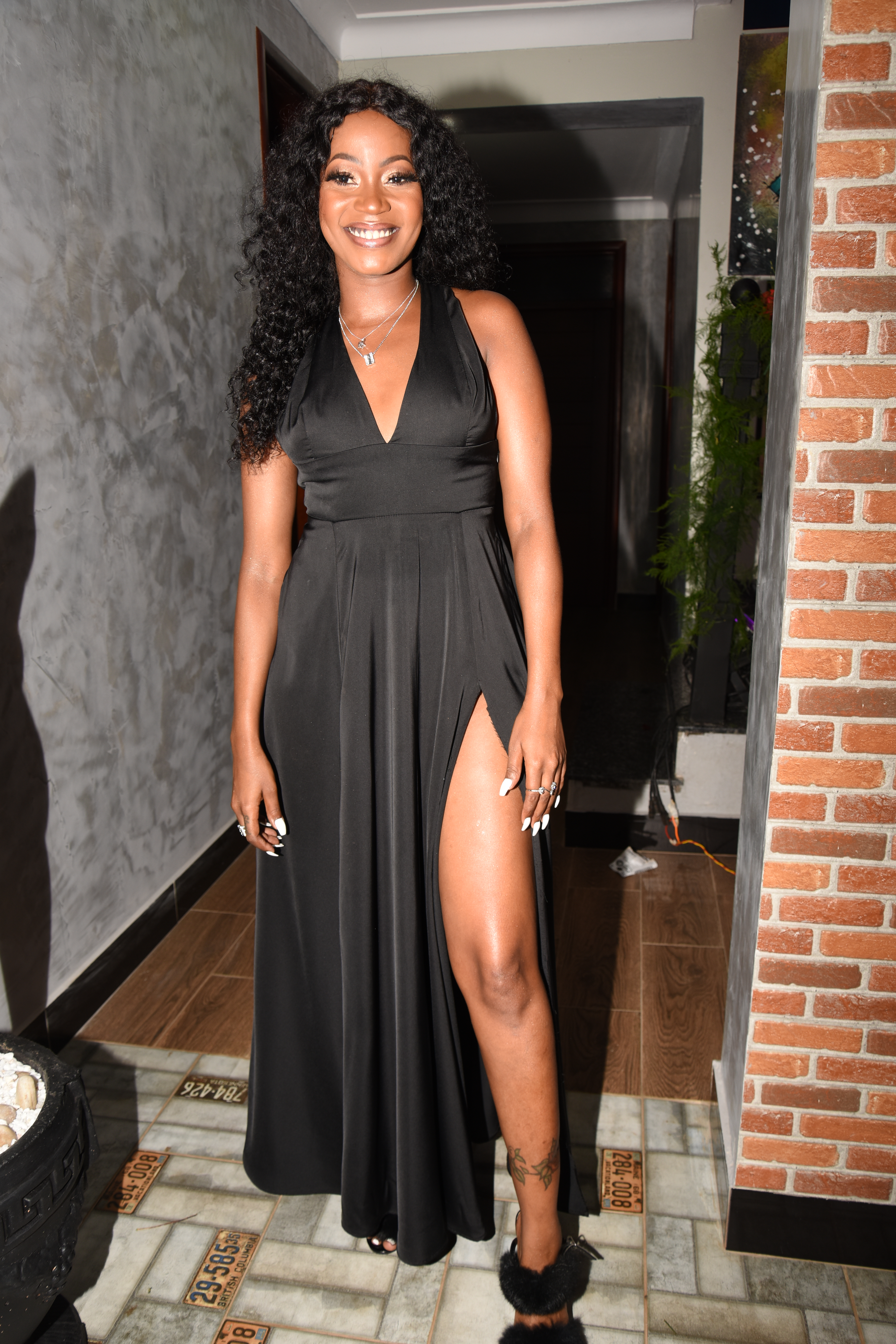
Sheebah Karungi.jpg

She held Nkwatako Concert in 2016 and Omwoyo Concert in 2018 at Hotel Africana in Kampala. Both concerts were organized by her management, Team No Sleep. Omwoyo Concert was choreographed by Cathy Patra who has choreographed and appeared in most of her videos. On her second concert, Omwoyo, Sheebah was criticized for her low vocal ability as a live performer.

Sheebah is also a business woman. Under her Sheebah Investments program, she has opened a number of businesses around Kampala including The Red Bar, Red Events (co-owned with dancer Cathy Patra), a hair extension business called Sheebah by Natna, Natna Hair Founder Sina Tsegazeab and others.

== Sexual harassment ==
Sheebah Karungi shared a video of herself on her social media platforms in which she described how a man who had armed bodyguards sexually harassed her before a performance. She stated that he had acted inappropriately in front of her team before she stepped on stage during one of her performances.

== Personal life ==
Sheebah stated that she does not intend to marry but that she might have children. She revealed her pregnancy while performing at her Neyanziza concert on October 4, 2024 at Lugogo Cricket Oval, Kampala. She gave birth to a healthy boy child Amir on November 24, 2024 in Canada.

== Single ==
- Ice Cream
- Nkwatako
- Tunywe
- Nakyuka
- Enyanda
- Ekyaama
- Nkwatako
- John Rambo
- Onkutude
- Jealousy
- Exercise
- Mummy yo
- mukama yamba
- Nkujjukiraa
- Somebody
- Neyanze
- Nkutuse
- Ninda
- Nkwata bulungi
- Muwe
- Bamsakata
- John Rambo
- Stress Killer

== Collaborations ==
- follow me ft Harmonize (musician)
- Silwana ft Carol nantongo
- Osobola ft Leila Kayondo
- nkulowozaako ft Alvin kizz
- Leeta ft Ruth Ngendo
- Tevunya ft. Fik Fameica
- Weekend ft Runtown
- Sweet Sensation ft. Orezi
- Kyoyina omanya ft. cristo panda
- Bwepaba ft Fik Fameica
- Boy fire ft Selecta Jeff
- Empetta ft King Saha
- Otubaatisa ft Irene Ntale
- Ayi ft Mudra D'viral
- Farmer (Remix) - With Ykee Benda

== Discography ==
=== Studio albums ===
- Ice Cream - EP
- Nkwatako (2016)
- Karma (2017)
- Samali (2020)

== Filmography ==
Year	Title	Role	Notes
2016	Queen Of Katwe	Shakira	Alongside Lupita Nyong'o, David Oyelowo and Madina Nalwanga

== Awards and nominations ==
Year	Award ceremony	Prize	Recipient/nominated work	Result	Ref
	The Uganda Music Awards	Female Artist of The Year	Herself	Won	
2018	Abryanz styles and fashion awards	Fashionable music video of The Year	Herself/Mumy Yo	Nominated	
2017	Zzina Awards	Artist of The Year	Herself	Won	
2017	Zzina Awards	Female Artist of The Year	Herself	Won	
2017	Zzina Awards	Best Collaboration of The Year	Sheebah & Ykee Benda	Won	
2017	Abryanz Style and Fashion Awards	Fashionable Music Video of the Year (Uganda)	"The Way"	Nominated	
2016	Abryanz Style and Fashion Awards	Most Stylish Female Artiste (Uganda)		Nominated	
2016	2016 Nigeria Entertainment Awards	Best African Female Artist	Herself	Nominated	
2016	Zzina Awards	Best Female Artist	Herself	Won	
2016	4th HiPipo Music Awards	Best Female Artist	Herself	Won	
2016	4th HiPipo Music Awards	Best Artist	Herself	Nominated	
2016	4th HiPipo Music Awards	Best Afropop Song	"Nipe Yote"	Nominated	
2016	4th HiPipo Music Awards	Best Afropop Song	"Otubatisa"	Nominated	
2016	4th HiPipo Music Awards	East Africa Best Video	"Siri Zari"	Nominated	
2016	4th HiPipo Music Awards	Video of The Year	"Siri Zari"	Won	
2016	Uganda Entertainment Awards 2016	Best Female Artist	Herself	Won	
2016	Uganda Entertainment Awards 2016	Artist of the Year	Herself	Nominated	
2016	Uganda Entertainment Awards 2016	Best Dance/Live Performance	Herself	Nominated	
2016	Uganda Entertainment Awards 2016	Best Dancehall Artist	Herself	Nominated	
2016	Uganda Entertainment Awards 2016	Video of the Year	"Nkwatako"	Nominated	
2015	3rd HiPipo Music Awards	Best Female Artist	Herself	Won	
2015	3rd HiPipo Music Awards	Artist of the Year	Herself	Nominated	
2015	3rd HiPipo Music Awards	Best Duo Group Artist	Herself with Pallaso	Nominated	
2015	3rd HiPipo Music Awards	Song of the Year	"Twesana"	Nominated	
2015	3rd HiPipo Music Awards	Best Ragga Dancehall Song	"Mundongo" with Pallaso	Nominated	
2015	3rd HiPipo Music Awards	Best Afrobeat Song	"Twesana"	Nominated	
2015	3rd HiPipo Music Awards	Best Afropop Song	"Go Down Low" with Pallaso	Won	
2015	Uganda Entertainment Awards 2015	Best Female Artist	Herself	Won	
2015	Uganda Entertainment Awards 2015	Best Dancehall Artist	Herself	Nominated	

== Associated acts ==
1. Ykee Benda
2. Fik Fameica
3. Roden Y Kabako
4. Chance Nalubega
5. Runtown
6. Solidstar
7. Carol Nantongo
8. Meddy
9. Alvin Kizz
10. The Ben
11. John Blaq
12. Grenade Official
13. Irene Ntale
14. Selector Jeff
15. Orezi
16. Ahdi weezy ke
17. AK 47 Mayanja

== See also ==
- List of Ugandan artists
