= Zziwa Kennedy =

Professional Ugandan celebrity hair stylist and dresser

Zziwa Kennedy Katebalirwe
- Born: 19 May 1987 (age 39); Ibanda, western Uganda
- Education: Makerere University
- Occupation: Hair stylist
- Website: hairbyzziwa.com

Zziwa Kennedy Katebalirwe (born 19 May 1987) is a professional Ugandan celebrity hair stylist and dresser. He is the CEO of Hair by Zziwa, a hair studio in Uganda.

== Early life ==
Zziwa Kennedy was born on 19 May 1987 in Ibanda, Wakiso district. He attended Kampala Nursery School (1991–1993), Buganda Road P/S (1994–2000), and Lubiri S.S. At Makerere University, he attained a bachelor's degree in Computer Science (2007–2011).

== Career ==
In 1998, Kennedy started acting with the Ebonies drama actors. He featured in many of the popular group's TV series including Diamond ring, Bibawo, and That’s Life Mwatu, Kitobero Alacat.

His work in the hairdressing industry started in 2010, when he enrolled at the Tina School of beauty in Kampala. After a short stint at the school, he went on to open his first salon, a makeshift structure, in Gayaza. This was opened using a little savings from his college days.

In October 2015, Kennedy started the Hair by Zziwa studio, a hair and nail clinic based at Krisna Mart mall, Kampala.

In Uganda, he has worked with major celebrities and public figures, including Winnie Byanyima, Iryn Namubiru, Judith Heard, Jose Chameleone, Bebecool, Leila Kayondo, Brian Ahumuza, Kim Swagga, South African Designer David Tlale, Ghana's Deborah Vanessa, Miss Vimbai, Juliana Kanyomozi, Vera Sidika, Deedan Rema Namakula, Princess Nassolo of Buganda, Nancy Kacungira and Seanice Kacungira.

He has launched a line of human hair extensions and hair growth accelerator products.

== Recognitions ==
Kennedy has received numerous recognitions and awards both in Uganda and abroad. He has appeared in Beijing Kids magazine. His awards include the following: Best Urban hairstylist in Beijing (2015), Best African Hairstylist (2013), and Hairstylist of the Year (ASFAS 2016).
