= Idris Sultan =

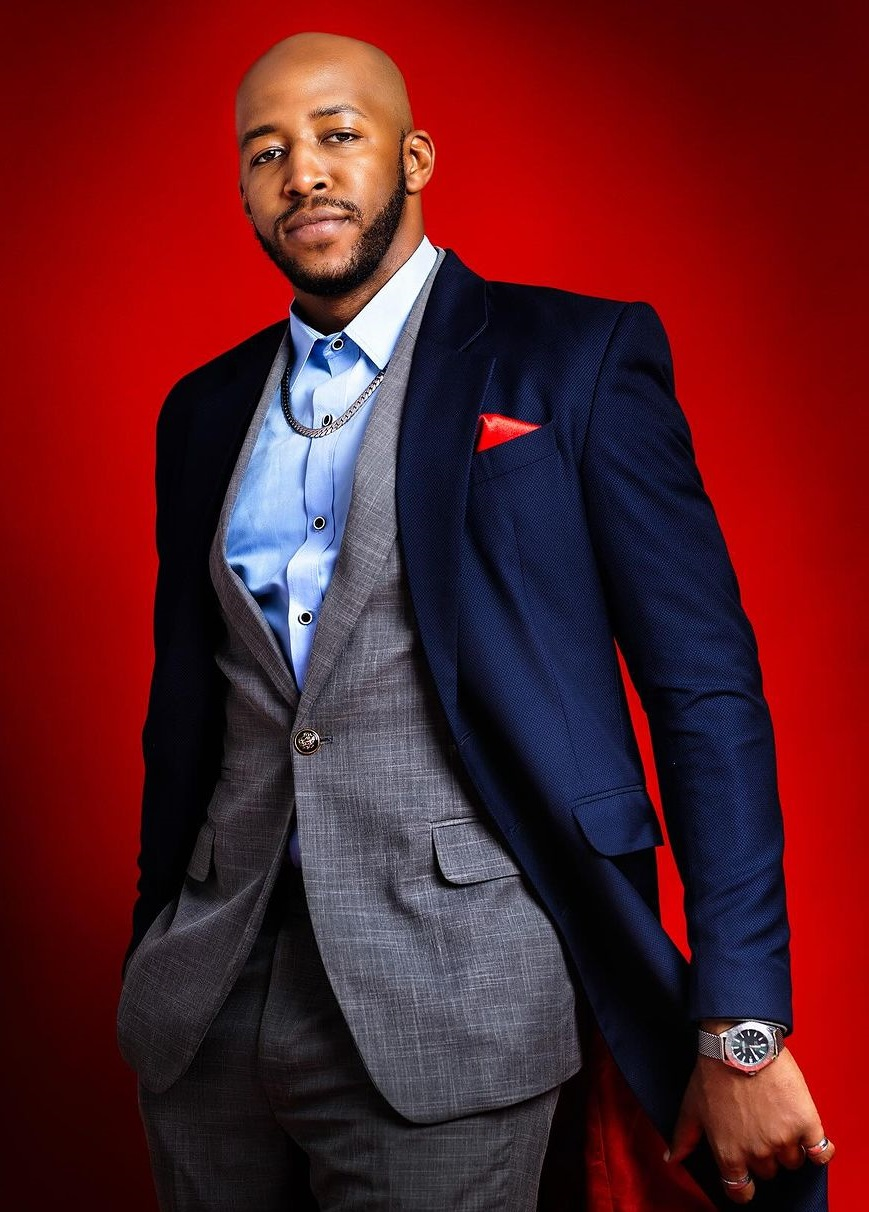
- Born: January 28, 1993 (age 33)
- Occupations: Actor, writer, producer, brand influencer

Idris Sultan (born January 28, 1993) is a Tanzanian actor, writer, producer, and brand influencer who won the Big Brother Africa-Hotshots in 2014 [1]. This is where he came into the light of fame. In December 2014, Idris became the winner of Big Brother Africa. Sultan also hosted a comedy news show called "Sio Habari," which is Kiswahili for "No news," and regularly hosts his own stand-up comedy shows. Idris Sultan is the most endorsed Tanzanian actor in over 7 years with record-breaking films in Africa.

Idris Sultan is also the first Tanzanian actor to be featured in a film streaming on Netflix, titled "Slay" (2021).

NETFLIX MOVIES:

Slay (2021)—Idris is the first Tanzanian to have a leading role in a Netflix production. Through SLAY, he created millions of impressions on News and Media 360 as a first for Tanzania.

Married to work (2023)—He produced his new film featuring Kenyan and Nigerian actors. The movie became the leading film in East Africa and West Africa, holding charts for 5 weeks, and also landing in the top ten in Jamaica. It became the first East African film to reach these heights.

NETFLIX SPECIAL INVITEE:

Bridgerton Series. Following his Netflix success, Idris Sultan became the only Tanzanian actor to be appointed as a special guest for Netflix in Africa, thus earning him a spot for special appearances at the ‘Bridgerton Series’ seasons 2 and 3 parties, both in South Africa in 2023.

NBA RWANDA SPECIAL GUEST:

Idris Sultan was selected and invited, among the few African celebrities, to make a special appearance on NBA Extension in Africa at the BAL games in Rwanda as well as make a short documentary about tourism in Rwanda.

TV SHOW HOSTED:

Following his massive social influence and his undoubted potential in the entertainment industry in Tanzania and across Africa, Idris Sultan was selected to host a couple of TV shows, both local and international.

Tanzania Music Awards 2024. The awards giving ceremony was aired by local televisions as well as global television networks, MTV BASE AFRICA and BET: - Bongo Star Search (BSS) 2019, 2020, and the current one (2024), which aims to cover East African countries: DR Congo, Uganda, Kenya, Rwanda, Burundi, and Tanzania.

PERSONAL AWARDS:

- Big Brother Africa winner (Hotshots edition) - 2014

- Most elite international host (Consumer choice awards)

- Celebrity style icon (Swahili fashion awards)

- Most stylish icon (Abryanz awards) - 2016

- Most influential celebrity (Tanzania digital awards)

- 100 most influential Africans

- Forbes's 30 most promising young entrepreneurs in Africa

== Awards and nominations ==
Year	Award	Category	Result
2017	Abryanz Style and Fashion Awards	Male Most Stylish/Dressed Celebrity (Africa)	Won
2016	Abryanz Style and Fashion Awards	Best Male Dressed Media Personality(Africa)	Won
