= Zikomo Awards =

Annual music industry award ceremony

- Current: Zikomo Awards 2023
- Awarded for: Outstanding achievements in the entertainment industry
- Country: Africa
- First award: January 10, 2021; 5 years ago
- Final award: 2023

Zikomo Africa Awards are Zambian awards established in early 2021 to celebrate organisations, entertainers and other minorities in music, film, philanthropy and fashion in Zambia and other African countries. The awards ceremony is usually hosted in the capital city of Zambia, Lusaka. They are one of the major Zambia's awards and they also promote culture as well as encourage people to showcase their talents. The awards categories are split into male and female. The awards also recognize humanitarians who are helping the needy in communities. The votes by the public and organisations are cast via their website in Zambia as well as across the African continent.

Additionally, the awards honor media personalities as well as outlets, actors, movie directors, photographers, comedians, entrepreneurs, and social media influencers, among others.

== Artist of the Year ==
The Artist of the Year award is the highest and most prestigious of the awards given at the event given to the artist(s). The criteria follow votes by the general public as having the highest audience appeal, online streaming, popularity and radio play.

== List of ceremonies ==
=== 2023 ===
The 2023 ceremony took place in Lusaka on 18 November 2023.

== Current award categories ==
=== Music ===
- Female of the Year
- Male of the Year
- Best Duo/Group
- Lifetime Achievement
- Best New Female Artist
- Best New Male Artist
- Song of the Year
- Best Hip Hop Act
- Video of the Year
- Best Gospel Artist
- Producer of the Year
- Best Dancehall Act
- Album of the Year

=== Media ===
- Media Legend
- Best Radio DJ/Personality
- Best Entertainment writer
- Best TV personality

=== Fashion ===
- Most Fashionable Celebrity
- Designer of the Year
- Model of the Year
- Living Legend
- Fashion Icon

== Host Cities ==
Year	Country	Host city	Host(s)
2021	Zambia	Lusaka	
2022	Zambia	Lusaka	
2023	Zambia	Lusaka	
2024	South Africa	Johannesburg	

== See also ==
- Nyasa Music Awards
- List of Malawian awards
