= MisRed =

Zimbabwean radio personality

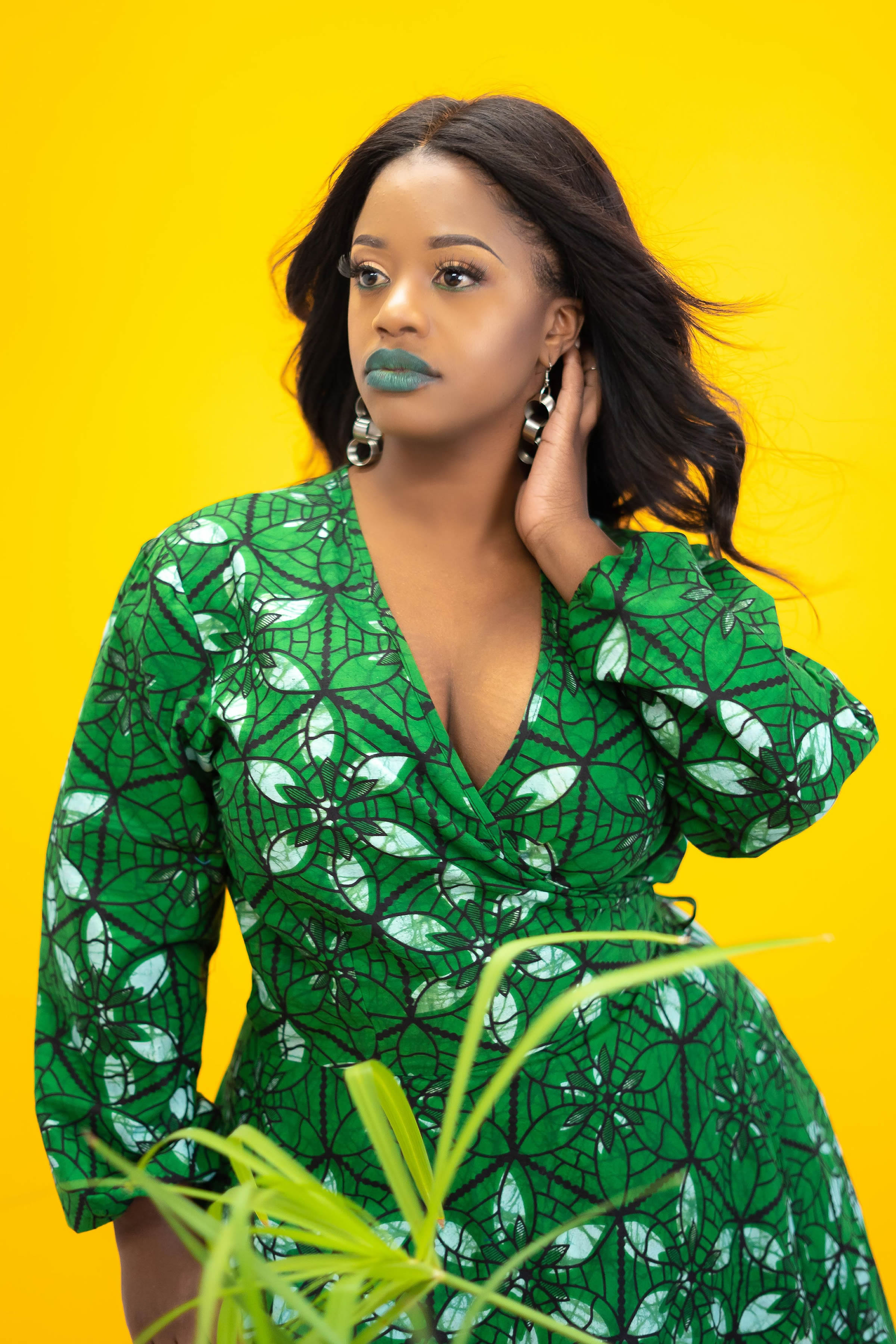
- Born: Samantha Mary Musa; May 8, 1989 (age 37); Harare, Zimbabwe
- Education: Speciss College
- Occupations: on-air personality; TV presenter; philanthropist
- Years active: 2012–present
- Known for: Media Personality

Samantha Mary Musa (born 8 May 1989), popularly known as MisRed, is a Zimbabwean radio personality, social influencer, philanthropist, brand ambassador, events MC & host as well as TV presenter and now Author. She is best known for anchoring ZiFM Stereo Drive Time Show, The Rush Drive Time.

== Early life ==
Musa was born in Harare, Zimbabwe. She did her primary education at Hallingbury Primary School, Bindura Primary School and Lewisam Primary School. She attended her secondary education at Heritage High School and Speciss College.

== Career ==
In 2012, Musa started her journey as a radio presenter. She started working at ZiFM Stereo, one of the leading FM radio stations in Zimbabwe, as co-host of "The Ignition" after the departure of top personality, Tinopona Katsande in October 2013.

In 2017, she was named co-host of weekly entertainment show, Coke on the Beat which aired on Zimbabwean television, ZTV with Tich Maruziva.

She also had an occasional presenting career at events including: OK Grand Challenge VIP Marquee, Steward Bank Mastercard Launch, The Edgars Fashion Extravaganza and South African Airways Travel Agency Awards.

She has covered international events such as Lake of Stars Festival, MTV Africa Music Awards among others.

In 2018, Musa partnered with Jungle Entertainment Ventures (a digital content monetisation firm), and KOSHA Management (a branding and business development firm) in a career move that is seeing her invest more in building an international media and content brand that resonates strongly with her growing audience.

== Awards and honours ==
Year	Ceremony	Award	Result
2016	Zimbabwe Radio Awards	Best Urban Female Presenter	Nominated
2018	Best Fashion and Style Influencer	Zimbabwean Social Media Awards	Nominated
2018	TRIBE of Influencers Awards (ZW)	Twimbo of The Year	Won

== Philanthropy ==
Beyond her corporate and business obligations, MisRed has a passion for female empowerment and advancement. She has co-founded, collaborated and has been an active voice in various socially conscious campaigns which include but are not limited to the following:

- Co-founder - #BeyondOctober - Annual Pink Event (Breast Cancer Awareness Initiative)
- Collaborative partner - Girls R Us (on going since 2017)
- Influencer - #PledgeForIdai - Active influencer for Cyclone Idai donations

== Personal life ==
Musa has lived in Mozambique and South Africa where she discovered her voice for radio. She has two daughters.
