= Hot Pink Catwalk =

Ugandan fashion show

Hot Pink Catwalk is a fashion show held annually in Kampala, Uganda. It was started by the Malengo Foundation and is now in its third year and is the largest fashion show dedicated to inclusion in Uganda. For the 2017 show, there were 32 models on the runway, 22 of whom had disabilities. The goal of the Hot Pink Catwalk Charity Show is to raise awareness and engagement about persons with disabilities.
