= Banke Meshida Lawal =

Nigerian businesswoman and make-up artist

- Born: 21 August 1978 (age 47); Ile-Ife, Osun State, Nigeria
- Occupations: Make-up artist; businesswoman
- Spouse: Lanre Lawal
- Website: bmpromakeup.com

Olabanke "Banke" Meshida Lawal is a Nigerian make-up artist and the founder and CEO of BMPro Makeup Group, a make-up and cosmetology firm in Nigeria. She won the award for Brand of the Year at the 2009 Eloy Awards, as well as the Nigerian Event Awards (2012) for Best Makeup Artist and the Makeup Artist of The Year at the FAB AWARDS (2010).

== Early life ==
Banke Meshida was born in Ile-Ife, Osun State, Southwest Nigeria at the Obafemi Awolowo University Teaching Hospital. Banke Meshida began taking Fine Arts classes in high school and by the time she was accepted by the University of Lagos, she had already begun practicing work as a makeup artist for friends and acquaintances. She graduated in 2000 with a second class bachelor's degree in English.

== Awards and recognition ==
Meshida has won a number of awards, including: Make-Up Artist of The Year (City People Awards 2005), Make-up Brand of The Year (ELOY Awards 2009), Make-up Artist of The Year (FAB Awards 2010), Best Make-up Artist (The Nigerian Event Awards 2012) and Makeup Brand of the Year (APPOEMN 2017).

== Personal life ==
Meshida married Lanre Lawal on 10 February 2007. They have two children.
