= Loza Maléombho =

Ivorian American fashion designer (born 1985)

- Born: 1985
- Occupation: Fashion designer
- Known for: fashion

Loza Maléombho is an Ivorian American fashion designer. She was raised between Abidjan, Côte d'Ivoire (West Africa) and Silver Spring, Maryland (US). At age 13 she found interest in fashion while designing for her mother her aunts and her own school uniforms. In 2006, she graduated with a BFA in animation at the University of the Arts, Philadelphia. In order to gain further experience in fashion, she then moved to New York City, where she interned for designers Jill Stuart, Yigal Azrouël and Cynthia Rowley. In 2009, she launched her self-titled label.

In February 2015, Solange Knowles featured her in the Black Designer Spotlight series with ten other independent artists. The singer Beyoncé (sister of Solange Knowles) wears one of her creations in the clip for her title Formation (on the album Lemonade).

She handles traditional but also original shapes, and plays with colors, reflecting her cosmopolitan journey, and in particular of this Brazil where she was born, from the New York of these beginnings, and West Africa.
