= Victor Ndigwe =

Nigerian model (born 1996)

Victor Ogonna Ndigwe
- Born: 7 February 1996 (age 30); Adazi-Nnukwu, Anambra State
- Occupation: Model
- Employer: Elite Model Worldwide

Victor Ogonna Ndigwe (born 7 February 1996) is a Nigerian model.

He is the first Nigerian Male Model to make an appearance at the fashion weeks in Paris, Milan and London.

In his first season, Victor was the campaign star for Missoni in their Fall/Winter 2016 as his debut Campaign Photographed by Harley Weir. He has also starred in Tom Ford's spring/summer 2021 campaign amongst others in his career.

He has modelled for the fashion houses, Versace, Balmain, Hermes, Zegna, Dsquared2, Fendi, Kenzo, Dolce & Gabbana, Zara and other reputable brands in the world.

In 2014, Victor won Elite Model Look Nigeria 2014.

In 2016, Victor was named by Vogue as one of the male models to look out for.

== Early life ==
Victor attended Murtala Muhammed Airport School after which he attended Chrisland Schools, Idimu for his junior secondary school and attended Lagooz College for his senior school years.

He got admission into University Of Benin, Nigeria to study applied mathematics while making music part-time. He eventually paused his education to focus on modeling after winning the Elite Model Look competition in 2014.
