= Bimpe Onakoya =

Nigerian makeup artist

- Born: 1974 (age 51–52)
- Education: University of Lagos
- Occupation: Make-up artist
- Known for: First African-based makeup artist at New York Fashion Week; Artistic Director of Maybelline New York Nigeria
- Title: Founder, Elite Makeup Pro
- Children: 3

Bimpe Onakoya (born 1973 or 1974) is a Nigerian makeup artist. She is the founder of Elite Makeup Pro, and the artistic director of Maybelline in Nigeria]. According to the Women of Rubies Initiative, Onakoya is the first African-based makeup artist to work at the New York Fashion Week. She has worked with several top designers including DKNY, Lacoste, and LaQuan Smith.

== Background and career ==
Bimpe Onakoya is an alumna of the University of Lagos. She developed her makeup skills without a formal training at the University of Lagos where she did makeup for participants of a week-long fashion and beauty pageant show – Hall Week. After the Hall Week show, she became popular and a go-to makeup artist on campus doing it for free for fellow students. In 2001, after graduating from the university, she was invited by Bayo Hastrup - a makeup artist to join British American Tobacco St Morris Style Selection event in 2003 which was her first paid makeup service. The event further put her in limelight and started receiving calls from different organizations.

Onakoya worked with Maybelline New York Nigeria as its artistic director and served as the brand's spokesperson as well as hosting master classes for makeup artists around Nigeria. In 2014, she became the first African based makeup artist to work at the New York Fashion Week and has worked with several designers and celebrities including DKNY, Lacoste, Alek Wek and Jourdan Dunn.

== Personal life ==
Onakoya and her husband were robbed in Johannesburg, South Africa in 2016 while she was with advanced pregnancy and dispossessed of all their belongings leaving them stranded in the country. Later that year, the couple welcomed a triplet (two males and female).
