= Rachel K =

American singer

- Also known as: Rachel k & Rachel Kay
- Born: Rachel Kiwanuka; November 1, 1986 (age 39); Tulsa, Oklahoma
- Origin: Kampala, Uganda
- Occupations: Singer, TV Host
- Instrument: Vocalist
- Years active: 2005–present

Rachel Kiwanuka, better known by her stage name Rachel K or Rachel Kay, is a Ugandan musician. Rachel K was born November 1, 1986, in Tulsa, Oklahoma. The daughter of Ugandan singer Halima Namakula, Kiwanuka has recorded several successful albums, toured widely throughout the region and collaborated with Ugandan and other regional artists. She has also worked as a comedian and television presenter, making appearances on such mainstream broadcasts as Jam Agenda and Tusker Project Fame.

== Television ==
Rachel Kay was a TV presenter on Top 8 Video Television show based in Los Angeles, California, and later moved to Uganda and continued to present on the popular television show Jam Agenda on Wavah BroadCasting Company.

Rachel K was part of the Tusker Project Fame season 3 judges, alongside Sanyu FM Presenter Crystal Newman, musician Mathew Nabwiso, a lead vocalist with the Misty Jazz Band and Soul Beat Africa Band. Rachel Kay hosted MultiChoice stand up comedy Stand Up Uganda in 2009.

== Music ==
Rachel K's mother, popular Ugandan singer Halima Namakula, signed her to her first record deal under her record label No-End Studios. There she recorded her first single "Every Time", produced by Henry Kiwuwa and Deno. In 2006 Rachel K performed with fellow musician Iryn Namubiru during her Unplugged performance at Club Silk Lounge. Rachel K collaborated with Rwanda's famous R&B artist Tom Close and she also had hits that had major air play on MTV Base 'Every Time' and 'I Love the way'. In 2010 Rachel K was part of the group that recorded Pepsi's World Cup theme song "Oh Africa" featuring Akon, Keri Hilson and the Soweto Gospel Choir, written by the Hip hop duo Rocky City and produced by Prettiboifresh. In the same year 2010, Pepsi launched "Oh Africa", at club F1 in Uganda. In 2011 Rachel Kay gave a farewell concert when she decided to go back to college in the United States and continue her studies in Fine Arts. In 2012 Rachel K reached the second round of auditions for American Idol.

== Discography ==
Over years, Rachel K has featured a number of Uganda Known artists like Radio & Weasel, Young Nick, Iryn Namubiru, Cindy, Bobi Wine, Unique and Karyn.

- I love the way - Ft. Young Nick
- Liar - Ft. Young Nick
- Maisha - Ft. Karyn & Unique
- Unaniumiza - Ft. Radio & Weasel
- EveryTime
- Muyaye - Ft. Iryn Namubiru
- Feel Me
- Pinduula
- Love
- Is it me - Ft. Bobi Wine
- Home

== Awards ==
Won:

- 2010 Diva Awards - Rachel K won Diva Awards International Female Artist of the year for the collaboration song with Akon and Keri Hilson "Oh Africa".
- 2010 Diva Awards - Video of The year
- 2007 Buzz Teeniez Awards - Teeniez fresh/breakout Artist of the year
- 2007 Buzz Teeniez Awards - Teeniez Best TV Personality Of the year
- 2008 Buzz Teeniez Awards - Teeniez Best TV Personality of the year

Nominated:

- 2011 Museke Online Africa Music Awards (MOAMA) - Voters Choice for 'Feel Me'
- 2012 EWorld Music Awards - Rock/Heavy Mental/Punk "Feel Me'

== See also ==
- Ugandan Americans
