= Noble Igwe =

Nigerian blogger

- Born: Noble Chibuzor Igwe; February 10, 1979 (age 47); Aba, Abia State, Nigeria
- Education: Pan-Atlantic University University of Nigeria
- Occupations: Blogger, writer, entrepreneur
- Years active: 2009–present
- Organization: The 360 Group
- Known for: 360nobs
- Notable work: Founder of the 360 group. Owners of 360nobs.com, Stylevitae.com, 360PR, 360 management
- Spouse: Chioma Otisi

Noble Chibuzor Igwe, sometimes called Nobs, is a Nigerian entertainment blogger and music critic, known for launching the entertainment platform 360 Group along with Tonia Soares and Oye Akideinde.

== Early life ==
Igwe was born and raised in Aba, Abia State, where he finished his schooling at National High School Aba. He studied at St Augustine's Anglican Seminary Nbawsi; Federal Government College Okigwe and graduated from University of Nigeria, Nsukka. He later attended Pan Africa University.

== Career ==
In 2009, Igwe started 360Nobs Limited. In April 2010, he launched 360nobs along with Oye Akideinde and Abimbola Soares.

== Personal life ==
On June 11, 2016, Igwe married Chioma Otisi. They welcomed their first child in January 2017.

== See also ==
- List of Nigerian bloggers
