= Exodus (musician) =

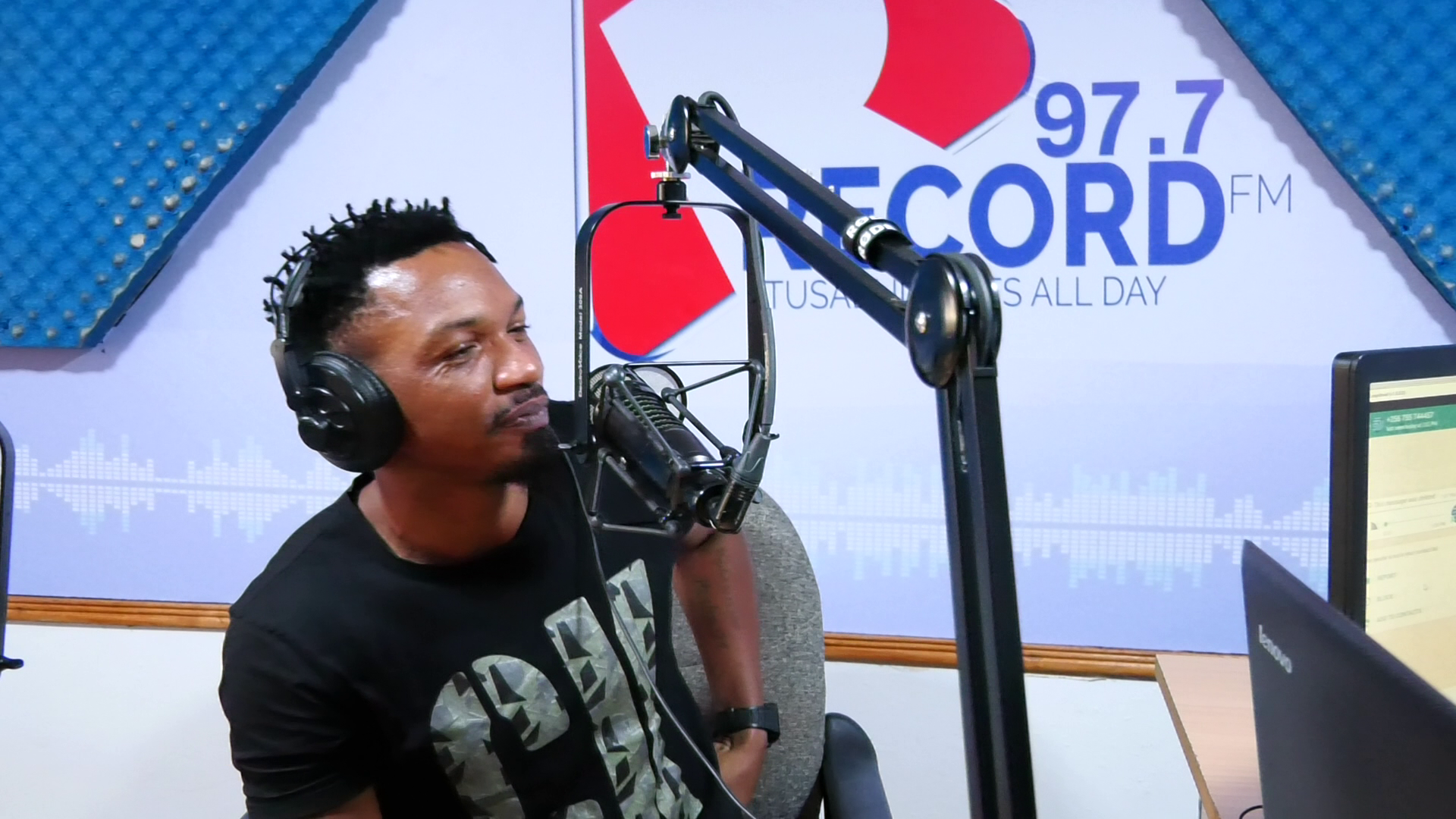
- Exodus At 97.7 Record FM

Background information
- Also known as: Exodus Ug
- Born: Lubega George Timothy; 8 June 1984 (age 42); Nsambya, Kampala, Uganda
- Genres: R&B, Afrobeats, Hip hop
- Label: Gear Entertainment
- Website: Official website

George Lubega Timothy (born 8 June 1984), is an Ugandan Gosple Artist known by his stage name Exodus. He made his musical debut in 2008 with his hit single "Ganja Man".

== Early life ==
Exodus was raised by a single mother, who died when he was 10 years old. He was then taken in until he was 12 years old by his polygamous father. Exodus had to join the streets of Kampala after being rejected by his physically and mentally abusive father. At age 12 in 1996, he started feeding in dustbins, smoking marijuana, sniffing petrol and pickpocketing for a living around Katwe, Dewinton road and Owino market which was his base. In 2001, he left the streets for Nakulabye in Kiyaaye where together with a friend, Dan Kimuli, began a new life.

He spent some time at an orphanage run by Mamma Irene Gleeson, an Australian missionary.

It was Kimuli who suggested that he visit pastor Robert Kayanja's Miracle Centre church. "I wanted to taste this Jesus that was preached that day, and the following week I went back and gave my life to Jesus" said Exodus in an interview. His first hit as a solo artist "Once a Ganja Man" narrates the journey of his life on the streets of Kampala to his transformation as a follower of Christ. In "Once a Ganja man" he narrates, "Remember the days of Ganja, when we used to smoke Ganja" This single became an anthem in churches, conferences and even at secular concerts. The Once a ganja man single became so massive and it got huge airplay on radio and Television stations worldwide. At his age, his first serious single managed to get airplay on MTV base yet those that joined the industry years back and even have the funds to facilitate their projects have failed to have their songs played on MTV. With just one song, Exodus won several awards from religious organisations and Buzz Magazine.

== Music career ==
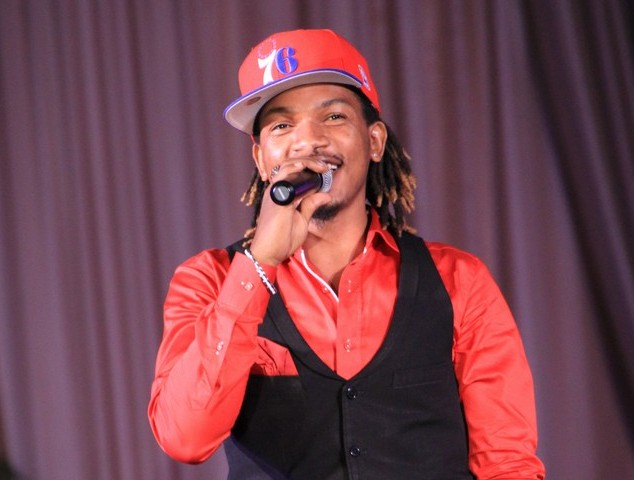
Exodus 2.jpg

After meeting Pastor Kayanja in 2002, in 2004 he became a leader and singer in the church choir. It is the same year that Isaac Rucibigango (Rucci) recruited Exodus and two others, Bahati Nsereko and Kenneth Tusubira, to form the Sauti band that toured the Great Lakes region.

He toured Tanzania, Rwanda and Kenya. While in Kenya in 2007, he left Sauti. In 2008, he released his first song Ganjaman. The song later became very big and it took over Uganda and beyond. He followed that single with Addicted, I am Walking and his biggest hit yet, Igwe. He is now working on his first 12-track album. With only four songs under his belt, Exodus has been nominated for, and won more awards than many musicians who have been in the field much longer. In 2009, he was nominated for an MTV Africa Music Awards and won four Buzz teen awards. He has also won the Groove awards based in Nairobi, Pearl of Africa Music Awards; won two Olive gospel awards and was nominated in the All Africa Gospel Music awards in London as one of Africa's best gospel artistes.

== Charity ==
Exodus worked as the Artistic Director and Peace Ambassador of the Irene Gleeson Foundation (IGF) based in Northern Uganda. IGF is a charitable organisation taking care of more than 10,000 ex-child soldiers. On 19 August 2012, Exodus held a concert in Kampala, Uganda, in the Victoria hall of Serena Hotel to raise money to support the children of IGF. Exodus performed with featuring artists such as Isaiah Katumwa, Maurice Kirya, Isaac Rucci, G Way, Hum Kay and Tabu Flo. All the proceeds went to the Foundation.

== Awards and nominations ==
Year	Award	Category	Result
2008	Groove Awards	Best Uganda Artist	Won
2009	Buzz Teeniez Awards	Best Gospel Artist	Won
2009	Groove Awards	Best Artist/Group of the Year (Uganda)	Nominee
2010	Groove Awards	Artist of the Year (Uganda)	Won
2011	Buzz Teeniez Awards	Teeniez Gospel Artiste	Won
2011	Olive Gospel Music Awards	Best Male Artist	Won
2011	Groove Awards	Artist of the Year (Uganda)	Won
2012	Olive Gospel Music Awards	Best Contemporary Artist	Won
2012	Groove Awards	Artist of the Year (Uganda)	Won
2012	Groove Awards	Video of the Year (Alemba & Exodus)	Won
2012	Groove Awards	Ragga/Reggae Song of the Year (Alemba & Exodus)	Won
2013	Buzz Teeniez Awards	Teeniez Hottest Gospel Song	Nominee
2013	Groove Awards	Artist of the Year (Uganda)	Won
2014	Buzz Teeniez Awards	Teeniez Hottest Gospel Song (Prophecy)	Won
2014	Groove Awards	East and Central Africa Artiste of the Year	Nominee
