= Spice Diana =

Ugandan musician

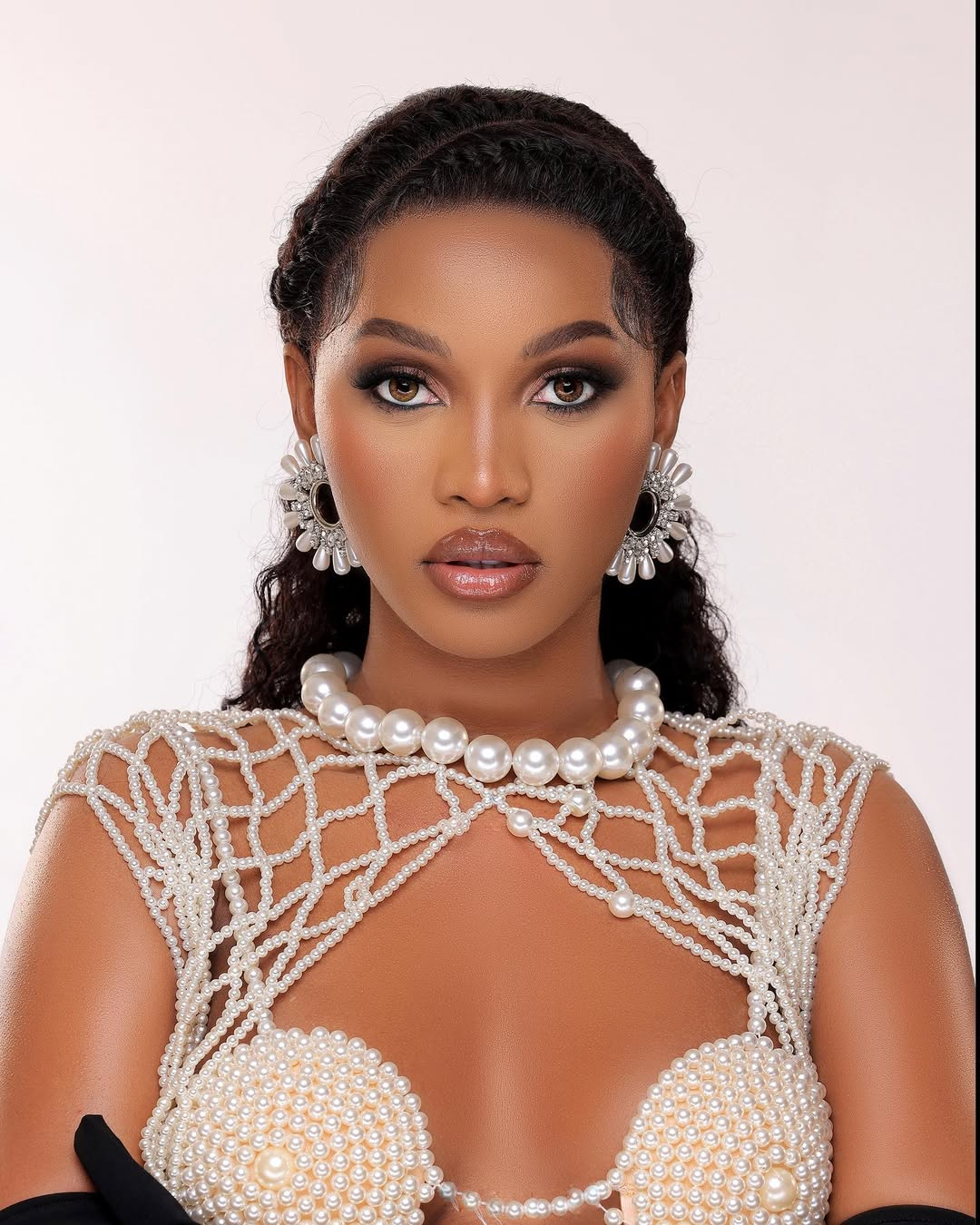
- Born: Namukwaya Hajara Diana; 1996 (age 29–30); Uganda
- Education: Makerere University
- Occupation: Musician
- Musical career
- Genres: Rhythm and blues
- Years active: 2014–present

Namukwaya Hajarah Diana (born 23 October 1996) professionally known as Spice Diana, is a Ugandan musician.

== Early life and education ==
Spice Diana is the oldest of three children and was raised in Nakulabye, Kampala by her single mother, Beatrice Nantale.

She joined Kibuli Demonstration School for primary education, St Peter's Senior Secondary and also attended Kampala citizens College where she got interest for singing and rapping but was discouraged by her mother. Spice Diana graduated from Makerere University with a Bachelor of Industrial Arts, while taking up music and school.

== Music career ==
Spice Diana started her music career in 2014 with her hit single "Onsanula" that won her an award the following year. She won Best Female Breakthrough Artist Award, which was her first award.

Her first manager was Dr Fizol of Avie Records. She then signed to the record labels of Twinkle Star and Humble Management in 2016 before going solo.

She has many hits including "Anti Kale", "I miss you" and "Buteke". In 2016, she decided to organize awards to recognize her team and named these awards the Team Spice Diana Awards. She performed at the award show with upcoming artists.

She has collaborated with both local and international artists, including Pallaso, Ray G, Aganaga and Jamaican Orisha Sound. She has songs with may artists like fik fameica, vyroota, and many others

== Awards and nominations ==
Spice Diana won Best Female Breakthrough Artist at the 3rd HiPipo Music Awards in 2015. The award is based on a popularity vote on social media voting.

Other awards include:

- Zzina Awards, Female Artist of the Year, 2018 and 2019
- Abryanz Fashionista Awards, Best stylish Female Artist, 2018
- Africa Entertainment Awards: Artist of the Year for Africa, 2019

== Police incident, 2017 ==
In 2017, Spice Diana was invited to perform at the Kampala City Festival, where she was beaten up by the Uganda Police after performing one song. She was singing "Onsanula", which contains a verse about the police being against the people. She stated on social media that the lyrics may have been the cause of her beating.

== Health scare, 2022 ==
In late 2022, Spice Diana had a health scare which led to hospitalisation and rumors of her death. She later confirmed that she had been treated for a damaged hernia and thanked Jesus for saving her life.

== See also ==
- List of Ugandan musicians
