= David Tlale =

South African fashion designer (born 1975)

- Born: 29 January 1975 (age 50); Vosloorus, South Africa
- Website: davidtlale.com

David Tlale (born 29 January 1975) is a South African fashion designer. He was born in Vosloorus in South Africa. He was raised by his single mother. His work has been showcased at the Cape Town Fashion Week, New York Fashion Week, and Paris Fashion Week. He has also designed collections for major retailers like Edgars. Tlale was a semi-finalist at the South African Fashion Week Elle New Talent Show Competition in 2002. In May 2003, Tlale started design studios in Cape Town and Johannesburg.

In 2022 Tlale was conferred with an honorary degree by the Tshwane University of Technology, and he dedicated the degree to his late mother.
