= Leila Kayondo =

Ugandan musician (born 1988)

- Born: January 1, 1988 (age 38); Uganda
- Occupation: Musician

Leila Kayondo is a Ugandan musician.

== Early life and education ==
Kayondo sang in school choirs and took part in school festivals when she was at Seeta Boarding Primary School and at Naalya Secondary School Namugongo for her O-Level. She continued the same road when she joined Greenville International School for A-Level. She graduated from Uganda Christian University in Mukono where she pursued a bachelor's degree in social works and social administration.

== Music ==
Kayondo started her music career in Dream Gals, an all girl-music group, after taking part in a competition that led to the group. The group had hit songs "weekend" and "Wandekangawo".

In 2009, Kayondo left the group to embark on a solo career. She has had hit songs like "Awo", and "Relaxing". She signed with Striker Entertainment, a Nigeria-based record label in Uganda in 2017, releasing two hit singles, "Respeck" and "Musaayi".
