= Jeevansathi.com =

Indian matrimonial portal

- Type: Subsidiary
- Industry: Matchmaking
- Founded: 2004
- Founder: Sanjeev Bikhchandani
- Headquarters: Noida, Uttar Pradesh, India
- Area served: Worldwide
- Key people: Hitesh Oberoi (CEO)
- Products: Jeevansathi Exclusive, eSathi, eValue, eRishta, Offline Matchpoints
- Parent: Info Edge
- Website: www.jeevansathi.com

Jeevansathi.com is an Indian matrimonial portal owned by Info Edge.

== History ==
In October 1998, Info Edge launched Jeevansathi.com, offering free services in the initial years. In 2000, when Info Edge was about to raise venture capital from ICICI Ventures, the latter suggested discontinuing Jeevansathi.com to focus on Naukri.com. As a result, Info Edge sold the website to its auditors, Amit and Rohit Tandon, while Info Edge founder and vice chairman Sanjeev Bikhchandani kept a 35% stake.

In 2004, Info Edge bought back Jeevansathi.

In 2008, Jeevansathi.com introduced a new feature which allowed prospects to chat with their prospective life partner on google talk with complete confidentiality.

In 2014, Jeevansathi launched its Android app. In 2014, Jeevansathi participated the Great Online Shopping Festival.

== Operations ==
The organisation has around 230 employees working in 54 offices in 37 cities spread across the country, headquartered in Noida. Jeevansathi also has 14 matchpoint across India. In 2012-13, the website had 5.6 million registered profiles.

== Business model ==
Jeevansathi.com uses the customer to customer (C2C) business model. The website has free list, search, and express interest and accepts other expressions of interest. Users have to pay get contact details. There are also offline centers operational for matching services. Jeevansathi.com Match Point centers provides offline users with matchmaking services. The first center was launched in Mumbai in 2008.

Jeevansathi.com became profitable for the first time during the first quarter of 2016-17, earning ₹65 lakh before interest and taxes. Its revenue grew 34% year-on-year from ₹10.9 crore to ₹14.6 crore in FY 2016-17.

== Awards and recognition ==
In 2010, the website received a silver award at the Radio Advertising Awards category for its "In Sawalon se muhje bachhao" radio campaign, a contest to find the most bizarre matchmaking questions they'd come across.

In 2016, its "Be Found" campaign won a bronze award in the "Services: Other" category of The Advertising Club's EFFIE awards.

== See also ==
- Shaadi.com
- BharatMatrimony
- Matrimony.com
