= Shaadi.com =

Indian Matchmaking website

- Type: Private
- Industry: Matchmaking
- Predecessor: Sagaai.com
- Founded: 1997
- Headquarters: Mumbai, India
- Area served: Worldwide
- Key people: Anupam Mittal
- Revenue: ▲₹261 crore (US$27 million) (FY22)
- Net income: ▼₹−13 crore (US$−1.3 million) (FY22)
- Owners: WestBridge Capital (44.38%); Anupam Mittal (30.26%); Anand Mittal (13.13%); Others (12.23%)
- Parent: People Group
- Website: shaadi.com

Shaadi.com is an Indian online matchmaking service founded in 1997. Its core market is India, Pakistan, and Bangladesh, but the company operates globally, with offices in Canada, the United Arab Emirates, the United Kingdom, and the United States.

== History ==
Shaadi.com began as Sagaai.com in 1997. Its founder, Anupam Mittal, changed its name to Shaadi.com in 1999, believing it to be a more marketable name. Its initial success was primarily among non-resident Indians, as Internet adoption across India was poor at the time, and conservative parents were hesitant to arrange marriages through a new startup. Despite some early personnel troubles, Shaadi.com saw success over the next fifteen years as Internet adoption increased and people became more receptive to online matchmaking. By 2008, it had become the world's leading matrimonial website for Asians, and had twenty million users by 2011.

In addition to online matchmaking, Shaadi.com runs over one hundred Shaadi Centres, retail outlets that offer matchmaking-related services. The first was opened in Mumbai in 2004.

In 2009 it collaborated with StarPlus to produce India's first marriage-based reality television show.

In 2012 Shaadi.com launched the Facebook game Angry Brides to bring awareness to dowry abuses in India.

In 2014, Shaadi.com launched Shaadi Cares, a social initiative to educate people regarding marital issues, including dowry and domestic violence.

In 2016, Shaadi.com acquired Thrill Group, a startup that included two dating products, Frivil and Fropper, founded by expat entrepreneurs Josh Israel and Devin Serago.

== Reception ==
In February 2020, Shaadi.com was criticised in the United Kingdom for having an option to filter out Scheduled Castes from algorithms, which was alleged to be caste-based discrimination in violation of the country's Equality Act 2010. In response, Shaadi.com said that the option "works as an important proxy to determine lifestyle fitment" but that it did not "remove any community from user preferences."

== WestBridge dispute ==
In 2006, WestBridge Capital invested ₹166 crore in Shaadi.com. The investment included a shareholders' agreement (SHA) clause which mandated Shaadi.com to give an exit to WestBridge through one of four options: an IPO within five years; the sale of WestBridge's shares to any independent third party, except a significant competitor; redemption and buyback options should an IPO not be held within five years; and drag-along right allowing WestBridge to sell 100% of Shaadi.com to anyone, including a competitor, if Shaadi.com failed to buy back shares within 180 days of WestBridge exercising its buyback option.

Between 2008 and 2009, Shaadi.com did not go through with its IPO plans amidst the global economic crisis. Disputes between Shaadi.com and WestBridge began in 2017 when WestBridge initiated talks to sell Shaadi.com to competitor Info Edge (owner of Jeevansathi.com). In 2020, WestBridge redeemed its preference shares into equity shares, but Shaadi.com did not buy back the shares within 180 days. In 2021, WestBridge announced that it would exercise its drag-along right and liquidate 100% of the company. Anupam Mittal denied consent to sell his shares or WestBridge's shares to Info Edge. He filed a petition with the NCLT and claimed that WestBridge was trying to gain control over the company by colluding with other directors of the company's board against the interests of the company.

WestBridge sought arbitration proceedings against Mittal in the Singapore High Court, stating it had full rights to execute drag-along right, and obtained a permanent anti-suit injunction from the Singapore High Court and Supreme Court. Mittal moved the Bombay High Court and obtained interim relief from the injunction order, arguing that the arbitration proceedings under Singapore law were void as contractual disputes came in the purview of the NCLT and Indian law. WestBridge further claimed that, according to the clauses in the SHA, only the contract terms were governed by the Indian law, but the scope of the arbitration was overseen by the International Chamber of Commerce with Singapore as the seat of arbitration. The dispute remained unresolved, as of 2024.

== Recognition ==
- Business Today highlighted Shaadi.com as one of India's ten best marketers in 2007.
- Shaadi.com was chosen for The Best Hindu Matrimonial Website category in About.com's 2011 Readers' Choice Awards.
- Shaadi.com placed silver in the "Best Use of Ecommerce - Self (own) brands Product/ Services" category of the 2012 Indian Digital Media Awards.
- Angry Brides placed silver in the "Social Media - Best Use/Campaign on Social Network - Social Cause" category of the 2013 Indian Digital Media Awards.

== See also ==
- BharatMatrimony
- Jeevansathi.com
- Matrimony.com
