= The Delhi School of Communication =

Coordinates: 28.50°N 77.19°E

- Established: 1995
- Dean: Prof Ramola Kumar
- Location: 321/2, IGNOU Road, Neb Sarai, New Delhi, India
- Website: http://www.dsc.edu.in/
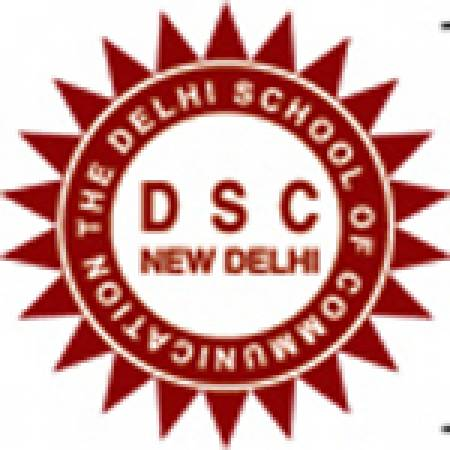

The Delhi School of Communication (DSC) is an educational institute founded in 1995 in New Delhi, India.

The most popular course at DSC has been the 2-year full-time Post Graduate Programme in Communication. This program was developed to be a top-of-the-line course enabling participants to foster an understanding of the dynamics of human communication in people's lives and the symbiosis with Indian culture.

== History ==
The late Prof. Surojit Lahiri, Founder Principal, of DSC was considered a marketing guru by many. Having started his career in the Indian Army, he moved on to work with Wipro, Jagatjit Industries and ITC. He thereafter joined Times of India group where he founded The Times School of Marketing and led it for over 10 years.

Prof. Ramola Kumar, Dean, DSC started her career at The Institute of Management Studies, Bikaner as the Head of Department in the year 1984. She moved in October 1985 to The Institute of Management Technology, (IMT) Ghaziabad as Professor, Marketing with additional responsibilities as Academic Coordinator—for 4 yrs. In 1989, she shifted to IMT Delhi Center as Chairperson, Evening Programme. She headed the center for 6 years and for a span of 5 years during the same period, she was the Marketing Course Coordinator at The Times School of Marketing. At DSC, Prof. Kumar was instrumental in helping conceive and launch the programme in the year 1995. Her areas of specialization include Marketing, Brand Management and Communications. Kumar has also regularly undertaken corporate training in Business Communication and Marketing. Prof. Kumar has been educated in the United States of America, Canada and India. She pursued her MBA from the University of Ottawa, Canada and was ranked 4th in the management programme.

Mr. Sanjeev Bikhchandani, CEO, InfoEdge; Mr. Ashok Mehta, CEO TV AD Indx and Mr. Rajiv Tewari, MD & founder, True Wealth Creators helped to co-found DSC. Mr. Sanjeev Bikhchandani was Product Executive, HMM and Account Executive, Lintas before he started Naukri.com. Mr. Rajiv Tewari was Publisher, Indian Express Delhi and has been the Channel Head and VP Zee News. Mr. Ashok Mehta has been CEO TV AdIndx, India's largest advertising and news monitoring organization.

== Academics ==
DSC runs the following programmes:

1. 2-year full-time Post Graduate Diploma Programme in Communication along with The Masters in Mass Communication
1. Short term courses in Advertising and Media, Public Relations & Event Management, Marketing and Sales
1. Industry workshops on Business Communication, Corporate Reputation, Competitive Marketing, Brand Management and Rural m Marketing

== Course details ==
The DSC 2-year programme is a broad-based course.

While the first year in school covers some basic courses, in the second year, three specializations are covered. The programme aims to offer an integration of communication and management at one level and theory and practical interface at another level.

== Some basic subjects ==
=== Marketing ===
The marketing area includes: Cultural Studies, Accounting and Finance, Business Communication, Advertising and Sales Promotion, Market Research, Mass Communication & Human Communication, Journalism, Statistical Analysis, Entertainment Marketing, Media Marketing, Strategic Decision Making, and Entrepreneurship.

=== Specialisations ===
==== Advertising & Public Relations Specialisation ====
This specialisation includes: Copywriting, Layout and Design, Public Relations – Publicity, Multimedia, Web Designing and eBusiness, Strategic Advertising Planning, Film Production, and Advertising Research.

==== Journalism Specialisation ====
This specialisation includes: Editorial and Editing, Managing the Press, Reporting and News Writing, Magazines and Features, Broadcast Journalism.

==== Marketing Specialisation ====
This specialisation includes: Consumer Behaviour, Brand Architecture, Competitive Marketing, Services Marketing, Direct Marketing, International Marketing, and Digital Marketing.

== Placements ==
=== Internships and Apprenticeships ===
Each student of DSC undergoes two apprenticeships (from 2:30 pm to 7:30 pm after class). The apprenticeships take place in any of the following fields: Media Marketing, Journalism, Advertising, Public Relations and Market Research. Furthermore, student executives sent for two full-time internships providing key industry exposure. Some companies partnering in the industry interface and final placements include: McCann Erickson, Maxus, Madison, Draft FCB, O&M, JWT, Rediffusion DY&R, Centre for Media Studies, Leo Burnett, LOWE, CNN, Star TV, Aaj Tak, Web Chutney, Euro RSCG, Airtel, HP, IMRB, HDFC, Voltas, LG, Perfetti, Solutions, Publicis India, Mudra Communications, IPAN, BITM, Genesis BM, Perfect Relations, Corporate Voice Shandwick and other organisations.

== See also ==
- Mass communication
- Public relations
- Advertising
