= Chapati =

South Asian unleavened wheat flatbread

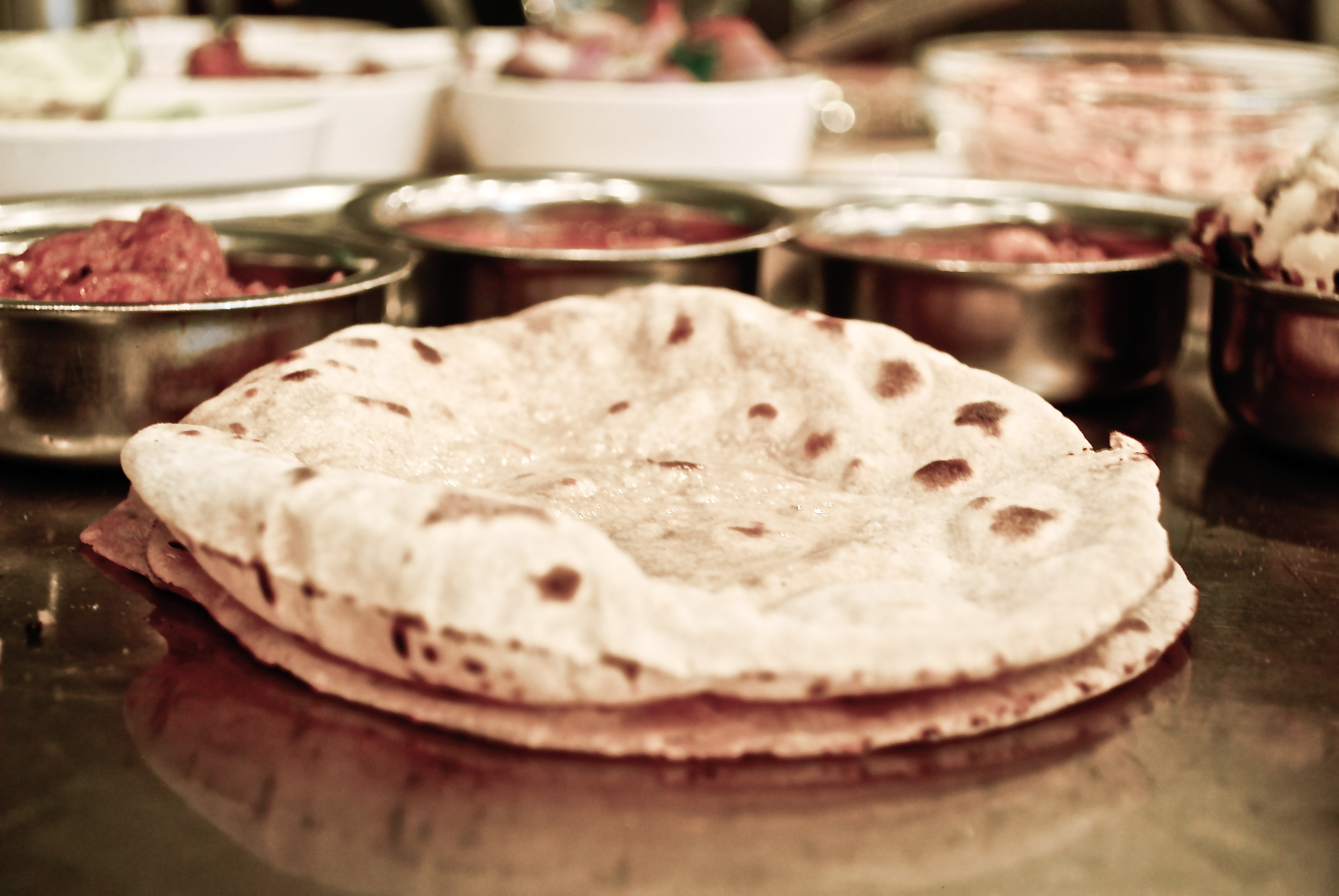
- Chapatis with various side dishes
- Alternative names: Roti, roshi, phulka
- Type: Bread
- Place of origin: Indian subcontinent
- Associated cuisine: South Asian (Central Indian, North Indian, Western Indian, Pakistani), East African (Kenyan, Tanzanian, Ugandan)
- Serving temperature: Hot
- Main ingredients: Atta, water
- Ingredients generally used: Salt, oil
- Variations: Rolex, kikomando
- Similar dishes: Paratha, puri, roomali roti, tandoori roti, thepla

Chapati (Note: alternatively spelled chapathi or chapatti; IAST: capātī, capāṭī, cāpāṭi, IPA: [tʃəpaːt̪iː, tʃapaʈi]) is an unleavened flatbread originating from the Indian subcontinent. Chapatis are made of atta, a type of whole-wheat flour, mixed into dough with water. It is cooked on an iron griddle known as a tava, then puffed up over direct heat. Another version, in East African cuisine, is instead fried. Chapati is a form of roti, and the two are sometimes conflated. It is common in South Asia—even in areas where rice is the typical staple—as well as in most East African countries. It is also eaten by the South Asian diaspora.

Evidence of foods resembling chapati dates back to the Indus Valley Civilization, and chapati is recorded in Sanskrit and Mughal-era texts. During the British era, chapatis were consumed by South Asians throughout the British Empire. They were introduced to East Africa by trade and immigration, including by Indian indentured railway workers. In the 21st century, it is common for households to purchase chapati rather than make it.

Chapati is eaten as the central component of a meal, with torn pieces used to pick up accompanying dishes such as dal or stew. Chapati may also be used for wraps, such as the Ugandan street foods rolex and kikomando. The main ingredient of chapati, wheat flour, results in its nutrition, flavour, and soft texture. Versions vary in size and may use various kinds of flour, including maize, amaranth, rice, or millet. Chapati is served hot, and it stales quickly. It is often homemade, while individually packed versions are sold as convenience food. Similar Indian breads include paratha and puri.

== Terminology ==
The word chapati entered English from the Hindi चपाती (carpatī). It is derived from the Sanskrit word चर्पटी (carpaṭī), a derivative of Sanskrit *चर्प (carpata, 'flat'). This describes the way dough is shaped by slapping it between the hands. (Note: A different etymology, presented by British Raj–era writer George Birdwood, states that chapati means "four-fold leaf", by comparison with a leaf plate.) It is also spelled chapatti or chapathi. In British India, the spellings chewpatty and chowpatty were used. The word has been used in English since the early 19th century.

Chapati is also called roti. Roti is a broad term for bread in the Indian subcontinent, but the term primarily refers to chapati in some regions, including in Bengal. In East Africa, roti and chapati are identical. The term phulka, meaning 'puffed', is also used, referring to a chapati that is puffed up over a flame. In some cases, a phulka may be thinner. In the Maldives, chapati is known as roṣi (or roshi), except in the dialects of Fuvahmulah and Seenu Atoll, where it is known as foḷi.

== Preparation ==
=== Ingredients ===
Chapatis are made of atta, a common type of whole wheat flour that is ground using a chakki (a stone mill). (Note: Some people use bread flour instead of atta. In addition, pre-mixed atta for chapati is sold in urban parts of India.) The flour is mixed with water, typically 60 to 80 percent the weight of the flour, to form a smooth, soft dough. Optionally, it may have small amounts of salt—about 0.5 to 2 percent, according to taste. Oil is also optional, with about 5 millilitres per 100 grams of flour; it is kneaded into the dough after the other ingredients. The dough does not contain yeast.

The atta used in chapati is typically milled to high extraction—about 70 to 100 percent extraction, commonly 90 percent in rural kitchens and 80 percent in industrial settings. It is often sifted to remove the coarsest grains. The byproduct of sifting, known as resultant atta, may also be used for chapati. In some villages, including many in Rajasthan, the flour is milled on a quern-stone. The flour typically uses the species common wheat, which results in a soft, pliable texture. Durum wheat is added in some parts of India. Wheat varieties' ability to produce good chapati is a large consideration when farming wheat or developing new varieties. Although wheat is typically sold without distinguishing between varieties, Indian consumers prefer wheat that produces better chapati, and varieties such as Sharbati wheat are priced higher due to such qualities.

=== Kneading and shaping ===
Preparing chapati with a rolling pin

The dough is kneaded by hand for 10 to 15 minutes, reaching a firm consistency and developing gluten, which gives it a viscoelastic texture that enables it to be rolled out. The dough may be kneaded mechanically, using a planetary mixer or a horizontal bread mixer.

It is left to rest for 30 to 120 minutes, though mechanically mixed dough may be rested for only 15 to 20 minutes. Resting enables gluten formation, and the dough becomes softer and more relaxed. If excess dough is prepared, it may then be refrigerated for one day.

Portions of the dough, weighing 25 to 40 grams (0.9 to 1.4 oz), are formed into balls that are rolled into a circle about 10 to 18 centimetres (4 to 7 in) across and 2 to 3 millimetres thick. (Note: When preparing chapati at home, it is rare to measure out the dough, but the size is roughly uniform.) This is typically done by dusting the dough with flour and rolling it out using a long, wooden rolling pin against a wooden board. Oil may be used during rolling. The force applied to the rolling pin causes the dough to slowly rotate as it expands, and additional flour may be added. Rolling to an even thickness is necessary for uniform cooking and puffing. If chapati is too thin, it may become too dry, and if it is too thick, it may be undercooked.

Mechanical shaping processes are faster and more consistent than using a rolling pin. The chapati press consists of two iron plates on a hinge, between which dough is placed; a lever connected to the lower plate is folded over the upper plate to apply pressure. These are used in both professional and home kitchens and can produce over 100 chapatis per hour. Another pressing device places the dough on a pedal-operated plate that pushes it onto a top plate; this can produce over 200 chapatis per hour. Dough sheeting machines using rollers are common in high-volume kitchens. Equipment used to make tortillas has been used for chapati in some regions. Dough that is pressed has suboptimal qualities as the application of force is different from that of a rolling pin.

=== Cooking ===
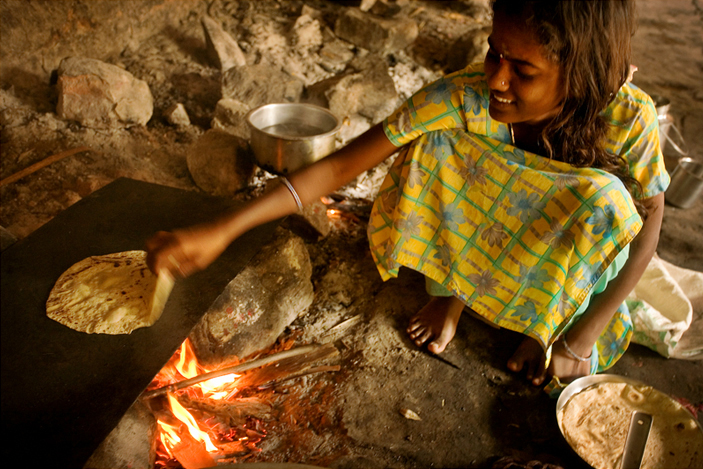
Chapati may be cooked over a flame or hot coals.

The rolled-out dough is thrown on a hot, dry tava—a type of iron griddle—and cooked on both sides. It cooks at 200 to 220 °C (392 to 428 °F) for 1 to 2 minutes—about 45 seconds on one side and 90 seconds on the other, being flipped once bubbles start to form. This rapid cooking on a hot surface is similar to the method used for Arab breads.

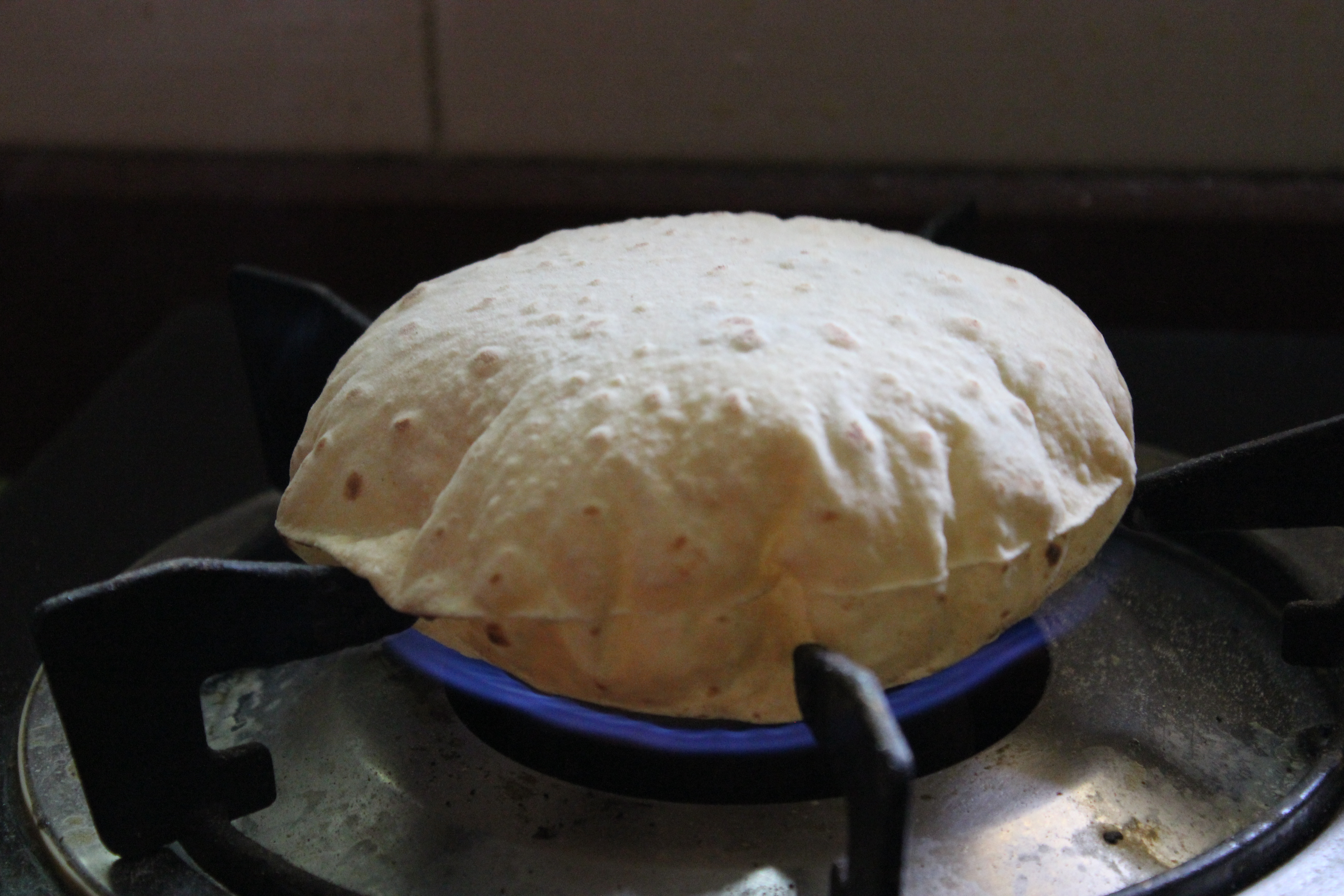
Chapati puffs up over a flame.

A chapati puffs up as moisture in the dough changes into steam. Sometimes, it is only partially cooked on the skillet, and then cooked directly over a flame or hot coals for a few seconds to puff up. It is also possible to puff up the roti directly on the tava, applying pressure with a dry cloth, or in an oven at about 350 °C (662 °F).

The inflation causes chapati to be soft and pliable. In the absence of leavening, the formation of steam is responsible for the separation of crust and crumb. The crust comprises almost the entire chapati, while the crumb contains starch that is highly deformed and gelatinised. Conduction is the main mode of heat transfer, forming a hard surface through starch gelatinisation.

Some machines both shape and bake chapati dough. A wide range of equipment is designed for chapati due to its popularity. The roti maker is similar to a chapati press but with a heating element that cooks the dough, which inflates and lifts the upper plate. The Rotimatic is an appliance that automatically produces chapatis from jars of ingredients, sold for household use. On a commercial level, semi-automated or fully automated machines are used; the latter produces 500 to 2,000 chapatis per hour. Some machines perform continuous sheeting and baking; these may produce hundreds of chapatis per hour. Equipment includes dough mixers, balling machines, and sheeting machines, using either rollers or presses. The dough is puffed up using a chapati puffer, which consists of steel plates with an iron rack. The finished product is cooled and packed in plastic. Mass-produced chapatis include ready-to-eat versions (which are fully baked) and ready-to-cook versions (which may consist of frozen, partially baked dough).

=== Classification and variations ===
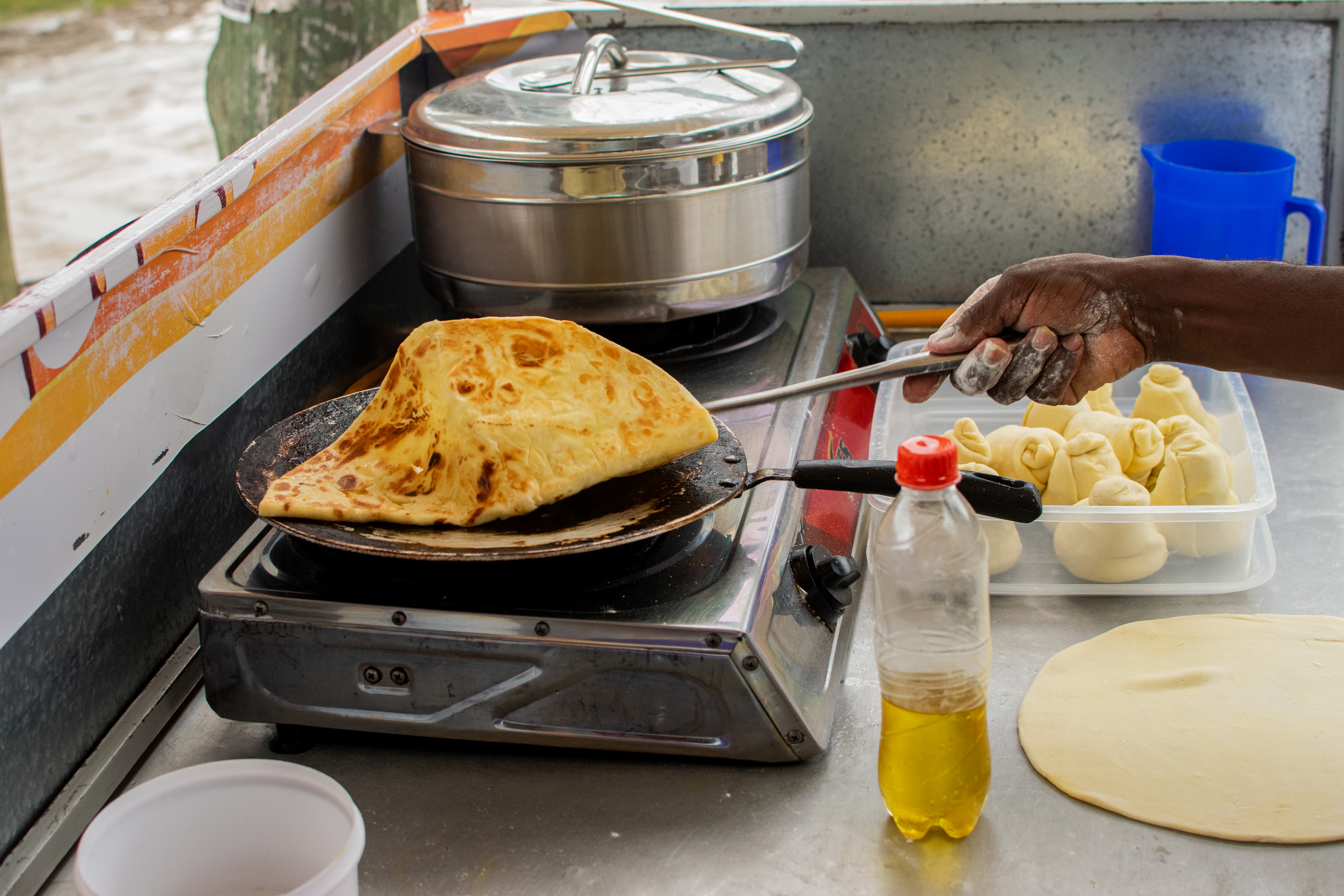
East African chapati is fried.

Chapati is classified as a single-layer, unleavened, unfermented flatbread. Like other forms of roti, it is dry roasted. Related flatbreads from South Asia also use atta but differ based on their cooking technique. These include paratha, which has layers of laminated dough; puri, which is deep fried; tandoori roti, which is baked in a tandoor; roomali roti, which is cooked on the bottom side of the tava; thepla, which contains vegetables and spices; and khakhra, which is low in moisture so that it lasts longer.

The chapati in East African cuisine is fried rather than baked over a flame, resulting in a soft interior and crispy, browned exterior. It is more similar to Indian paratha than chapati, though it is thinner than paratha and uses less oil. In Kenya, it is cooked on a charcoal stove, using oil, butter, or lard. A type of skillet called jua kali is designed for chapati, enabling flipping by hand. In Zanzibari cuisine, chapati may be made of wheat or millet. Millet chapati is more difficult to prepare due to the lack of gluten; it is thicker than wheat chapati, shaped by slapping with the hands rather than rolling. Chapati in Swahili cuisine may be made of atta or a white flour known as unga.

India has many versions of chapati. The size varies by region. Chapatis made in rural areas are thicker than those in urban areas. The Gaddi people of Himachal Pradesh have a type of chapati called rot is large enough that one is an entire serving. In Rajasthan, pods of the sangri tree are added to wheat chapati.

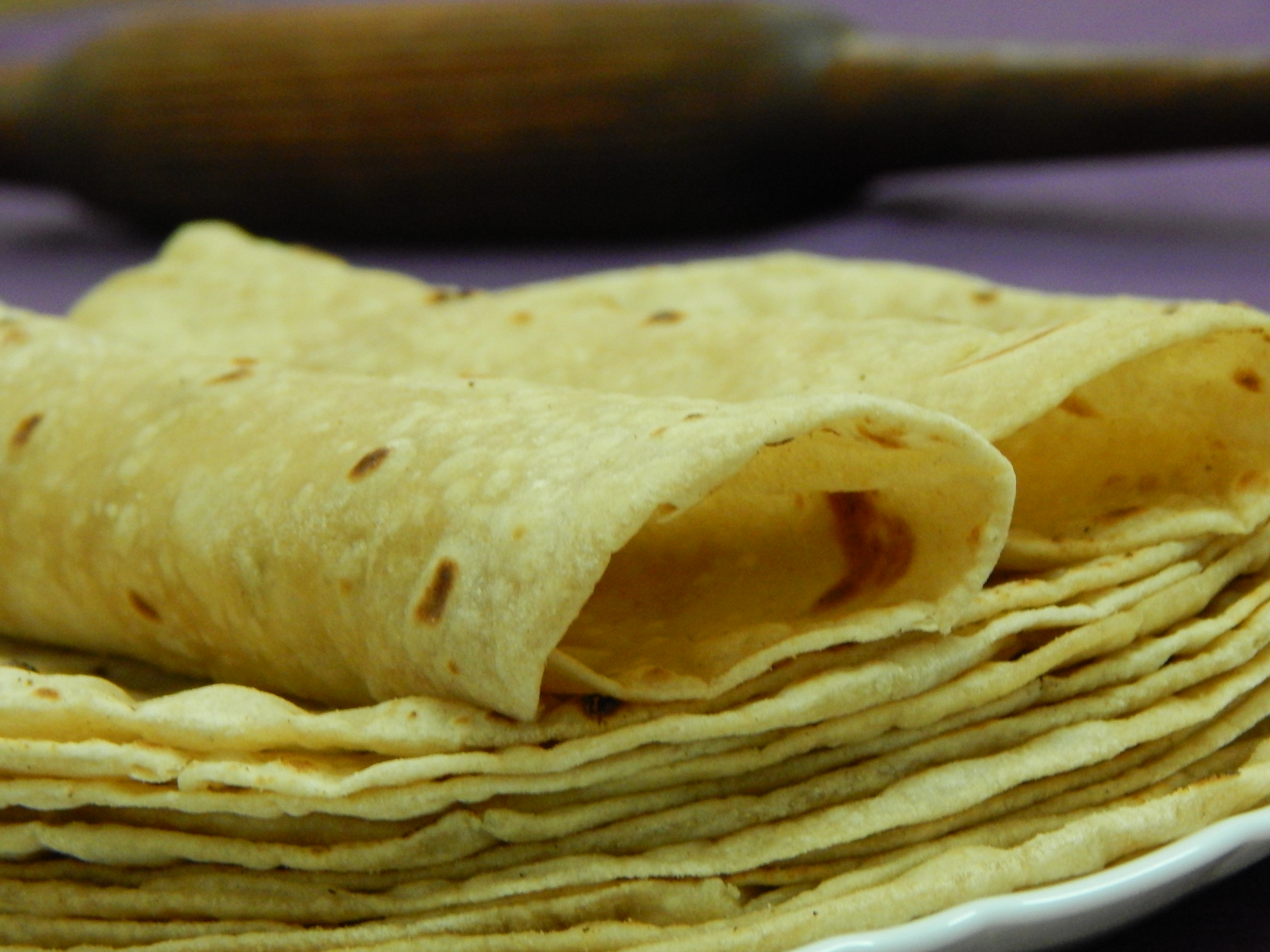
A Gujarati style of chapati, known as rotli, which is thinner

Additional flours may be added to chapati in places where wheat is less available. A common version, known as mesi roti, uses Bengal gram chickpeas for 20 to 30 percent of the flour. Cornmeal chapatis are common in parts of North India in the winter, and a version in Punjabi cuisine uses corn and mustard greens. Amaranth chapati is eaten in the Himalayas; amaranth lacks the gluten necessary for chapati but can be combined with wheat. In rice-growing regions of Pakistan, rice flour, which also lacks gluten, is combined with other flours to prepare chapati. In the cuisine of Kerala, rice flour is used to make a thin chapati called podi-patthiri, which is served with coconut milk. The Tangkhul people of Manipur consume a chapati of rice flour, sugar syrup, and ground sesame. Rice flour is also used for commercially produced gluten-free chapati, with hydrocolloids added for texture. Millets may be blended with other flours to produce chapatis in India; these include finger millet, pearl millet, kodo millet, and sorghum; the latter is used for a crunchy, dry chapati. In Gujarati cuisine, a rotli is a chapati that is very thin and made of millet. Sweet potato may be added to wheat chapati in Kenya.

== Serving ==
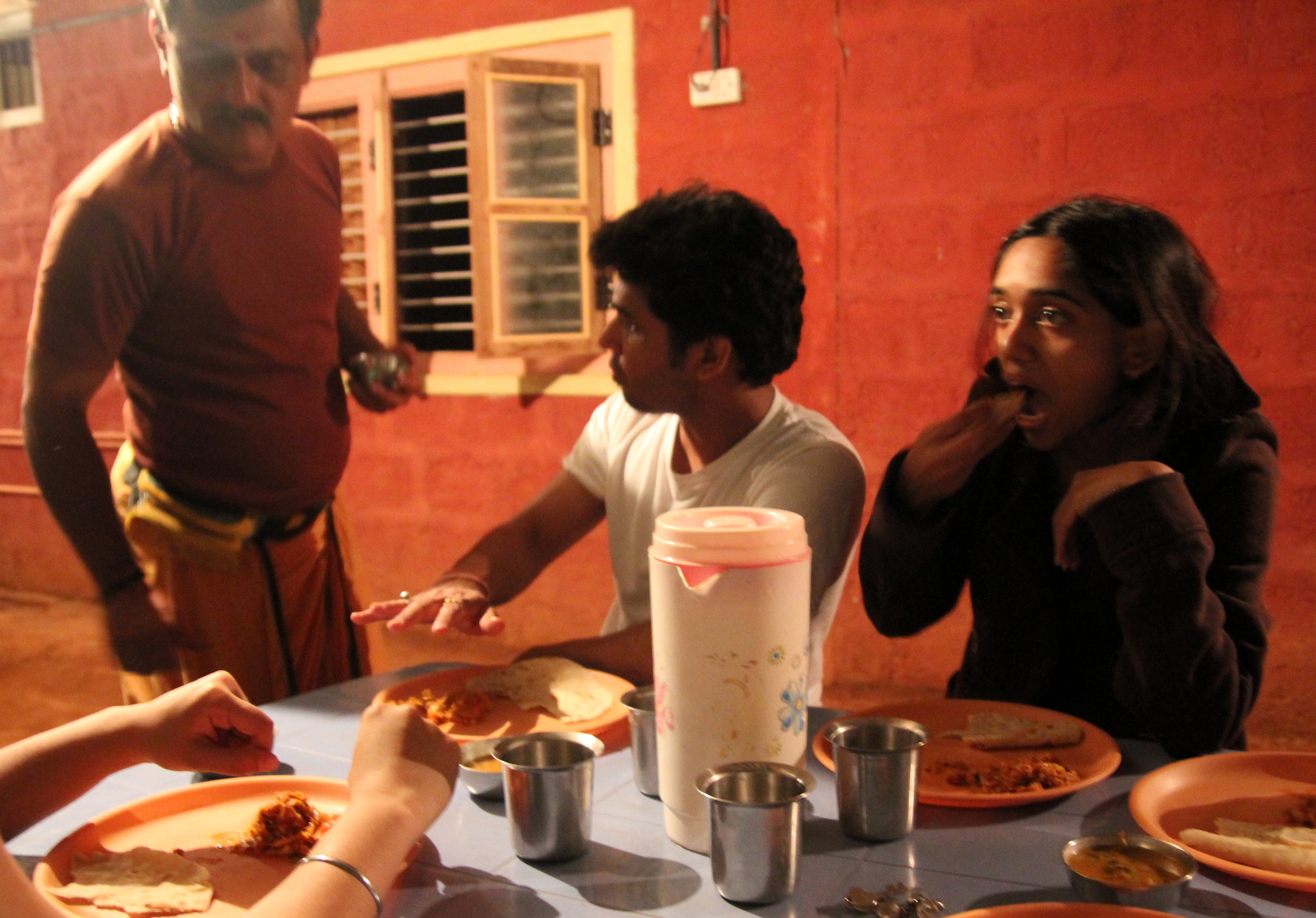
Chapati is used to pick up food to eat by hand.

Chapatis are served while hot and fresh. They are often topped with butter or ghee for flavor and softness. They may be stacked in a container until consumption. According to a 2020 survey in Delhi, the median portion size of chapati is 70 grams, averaging 2 chapatis for women and 3 chapatis for men. According to a 2013 study in the United Kingdom, the mean portion size is 90 g for adults, 64 g for school-aged children, and 44 g for preschool children. Because it quickly becomes stale, chapati is typically eaten while fresh. In India, stale chapati may also used as cattle feed, or it may be mashed to make baby food.

Chapati may be served for any meal. Like other Indian flatbreads, it is served as the central component of a typical meal; it is eaten by using a hand to tear the bread and pick up the accompanying food, or it may be dipped into soup. Chapati is the main source of carbohydrates in a meal with other, non-starchy dishes. It is commonly paired with curries, vegetable dishes (such as sabzi), stews, or chutneys. In Indian and Sri Lankan cuisine, it is commonly eaten with dal, a legume-based dish, an example of grains paired with legumes that provide protein. In Pakistani cuisine, it may be paired with dishes such as halwa for breakfast. In East African cuisine, chapati is eaten with mashes or stews.

Chapati, like other flatbreads, may be used for wraps. In the cuisine of Afghanistan and Pakistan, it is served with kebabs. In the cuisine of Uganda, an omelette wrapped in a chapati is a rolex, while a chapati with cooked beans is a kikomando.

== Nutrition and properties ==
=== Nutrition ===
Bread (chapati/roti), plain, commercially prepared
Nutritional value per 100 g (3.5 oz)
- Energy: 1,247 kJ (298 kcal)
- Carbohydrates: 46.36 g
- Sugars: 2.72
- Dietary fibre: 4.9 g
- Fat: 7.45 g
- Protein: 11.25 g
Vitamins and minerals
| Vitamins | Quantity %DV^{†} |
| Thiamine (B1) | 46% 0.55 mg |
| Riboflavin (B2) | 15% 0.2 mg |
| Niacin (B3) | 42% 6.78 mg |
| Pantothenic acid (B5) | 0% 0 mg |
| Vitamin B6 | 16% 0.270 mg |
| Folate (B9) | 0% 0 μg |
| Vitamin E | 6% 0.88 mg |
| Vitamin K | 0% 0 μg |
| Minerals | Quantity %DV^{†} |
| Calcium | 7% 93 mg |
| Iron | 17% 3 mg |
| Magnesium | 15% 62 mg |
| Manganese | 0% 0 mg |
| Phosphorus | 15% 184 mg |
| Potassium | 9% 266 mg |
| Sodium | 18% 409 mg |
| Zinc | 14% 1.57 mg |
- Link to USDA Database entry
- ^{†}Percentages estimated using US recommendations for adults, except for potassium, which is estimated based on expert recommendation from the National Academies.

The nutritional content of chapati comes from wheat. It is a major source of energy and carbohydrates. It consists of about 83–85% carbohydrates, including 57% starch, as well as 11–13% protein and 1–2% fat. The content of dietary fibre is high compared to rice or white bread. Chapati has a lower glycemic index than leavened breads, at around 60. A typical chapati eaten in Kenyan Luo cuisine—prepared with margarine—is high in fat, consisting of about 11.5% fat, 6.9% protein, and 28.1% water.

Chapati is an incomplete source of micronutrients. The cooking process results in the loss of vitamins, including vitamin B and lysine. The cooking conditions and thickness affect the loss of vitamins, particularly thiamin. Minerals are also lost due to phytic acid reactions. Resting the dough allows phytic acid to break down, thus increasing mineral value. Chapati is high in zinc due to being whole-wheat. Chapati made of resultant atta is higher in niacin, thiamin, and riboflavin. Chapati may be fortified with vegetables or additional grains to increase its nutritional content.

=== Physical qualities ===
Qualities desired by consumers of chapati include a softness, chewiness, pliability, a wheaty flavour and scent, mild sweetness, cream colour, and a high height when puffed. The desired appearance has uniform dark brown spots and no cracks. The size, shape, and preparation method vary greatly.

As wheat flour is the main ingredient, the wheat and the way that it is processed have a strong impact on the qualities of chapati. The optimal flour has low to medium hardness and medium gluten strength, and is fine enough for 80% of its grains to pass through a 60-mesh sieve. It contains a medium amount of protein—about 10–13%—as well as 7–9% moisture and 10–16% damaged starch. Protein is a major factor on qualities; a higher amount results in toughness, while a lower amount results in brittleness. Some types of protein have significant effects, including glutenin and gliadin, which comprise gluten. High gliadin content results in toughness. Damaged starch is correlated with water absorption, thus increasing softness. Flour with higher sugar and diastatic enzymes results in sweeter chapati. The species of wheat affects properties; durum and emmer wheat result in dryer and tougher chapatis than common wheat, although blends containing small amounts of durum may result in acceptable, sweeter chapatis. Varieties of common wheat differ in their chapati-making qualities. Indian wheat varieties may contain the optimal protein contents for chapati.

The milling method also affects chapati due to the way starch is broken down. Chakki-milled flour produces sweeter chapati. The use of resultant atta results in less damaged starch. The level of flour extraction determines the colour, and higher-extraction flour increases softness. White flour does not produce the ideal texture due to the lack of bran.

The preparation process also has a strong impact on flavour and texture. Hydration and gluten formation during mixing contribute to texture. A high cooking temperature increases the height of puffing. The colour, flavour, and scent of chapati are a result of the Maillard reaction during cooking. Like other wheat-based foods, chapati contains acrylamides, a potentially hazardous compound produced through the Maillard reaction.

Some types of wheat flour require more water and result in softer and sweeter chapati. Adding salt to the dough can improve the texture of the dough to roll out and the final chapati. Adding oil can improve softness and pliability during storage, though it hinders puffing. Additives such as emulsifiers may improve the texture.

Different types of flours may be added to improve nutrition, shelf life, or physical qualities; their use has varying effects. Chapati made of millet may have a lower glycemic index. Composite flours using barley or germinated wheat have been shown to result in acceptable chapatis, while flours such as soya flour may result in acceptable chapatis with increased nutritional value. Adding pulse flours increases protein content, while potato flour may increase softness and shelf life.

=== Shelf life ===
Chapati experiences quick staling, like other flatbreads, due to its thinness and high moisture. It has a shelf life of 24 to 36 hours, and peak freshness only lasts a few hours. It stales due to starch retrogradation, a process in which the structure of starch molecules changes; gluten absorbs moisture from the starch. It quickly loses its texture, becoming hard and fragile, so it cannot easily be torn. It also loses its flavour and experiences enzymatic browning. Mould may form within 3 to 4 days.

Chapati with higher shelf life may be produced with chemical preservatives, such as the stabiliser guar gum or the antifungal agent sorbic acid, as well as enzymes or emulsifiers. However, some preservatives result in bitterness. Thermal processing may also increase the shelf life without preservatives, and vacuum packing may produce chapatis that last one year. Chapati that is partly baked may be better for storing or freezing. Freezing and thawing chapati weakens proteins, so additives are used in frozen products.

== History ==
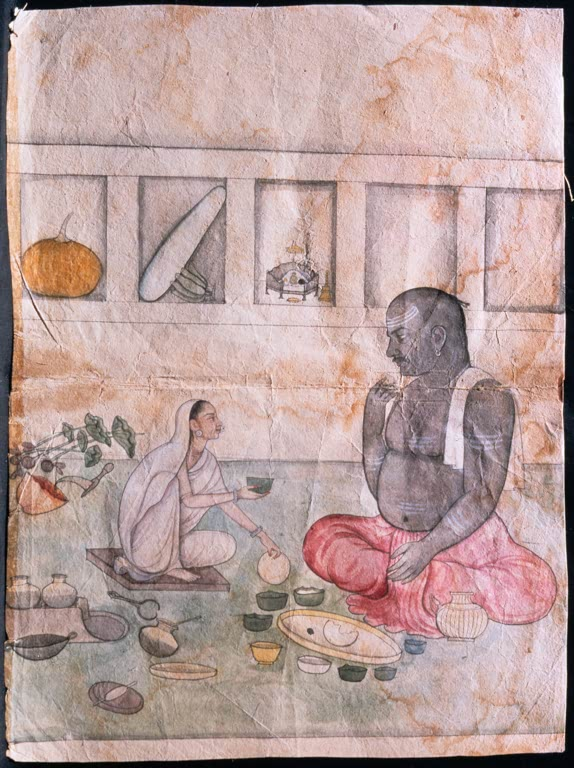
18th-century painting of chapati

Sites of the Bronze Age Indus Valley Civilization contain clay and metal artefacts resembling tavas, indicating the possible existence of chapati. Historian K. T. Achaya notes the existence of cave paintings depicting the preparation of round dough. Chapati was not common during the Vedic period, which followed the Indus Valley Civilization. Thus, it was never included in the Hindu classification system of kaccha and pukka food; as a food that is not boiled, it would have been classified as a pukka food to be eaten outside of the household. As it was not subject to this rule, it instead became an everyday food.

The word chapati was used in Sanskrit texts and later in the Mughal Empire; it is noted in the 16th-century document Ain-i-Akbari by Abu'l-Fazl ibn Mubarak, the vizier of Mughal emperor Akbar. The 17th-century priest Portuguese Sebastien Manrique, travelling to Lahore, described chapati as a thin, baked bread that was eaten by the lower class. The Portuguese in India ate chapati, alongside Western-style bread. Anglo-Indians in British India also ate chapati as they assimilated into Indian culture.

During the Indian Rebellion of 1857, the Chapati Movement was an event that British officials associated with rebellion. Village watchmen carried chapatis in hand from village to village, giving instructions to make more and send on to the next village, a pattern that spread very fast. The motive was unknown. According to food writer Nina Mukerjee Furstenau, the role of chapati in this event signifies the symbolism of bread as a simple, common food, while writer Anita Mannur views it as an example of culinary practices being difficult to comprehend.

Indian indentured labourers introduced chapati to the Caribbean, leading to regional forms of roti. In the 1880s, indentured shipworkers from the North-Western Provinces of British India demanded chapati, while others demanded rice, leading to the creation of two separate rations. Chapati was popularised in Kerala—a part of India where wheat was not a staple—following the Vaikom Satyagraha protest of 1924, during which Sikh activists from Punjab ran a langar kitchen that served them for free. Chapati was introduced to East Africa by immigrants from the subcontinent. In Kenya, it was likely introduced amid widespread migration from India in the late 19th and early 20th centuries. Indian labourers on British Empire–run railways brought their cuisine, including chapati, to both Kenya and Uganda. It was also an important food at prisons in the British protectorate of Zanzibar, with a 1930 letter listing prisoners' complaints about how it was prepared.

Beginning in the 1990s, Indians have increasingly consumed wheat as Western-style bread instead of chapati. As more women entered the workforce in the country, they lacked the time or knowledge to prepare chapati, requiring them to hire cooks or purchase ready-to-eat chapati. Ready-to-cook chapati also became common around the 2010s. In 21st-century Kenya, chapati has become a more common snack than potato chips and a more common breakfast than bread, having previously been reserved for special occasions, according to Oyunga Pala of The Elephant. Its popularity in the country has increased while the historical staple ugali has declined, as evidenced by Agriculture and Food Authority data showing an increase in wheat consumption in 2024.

== Consumption ==
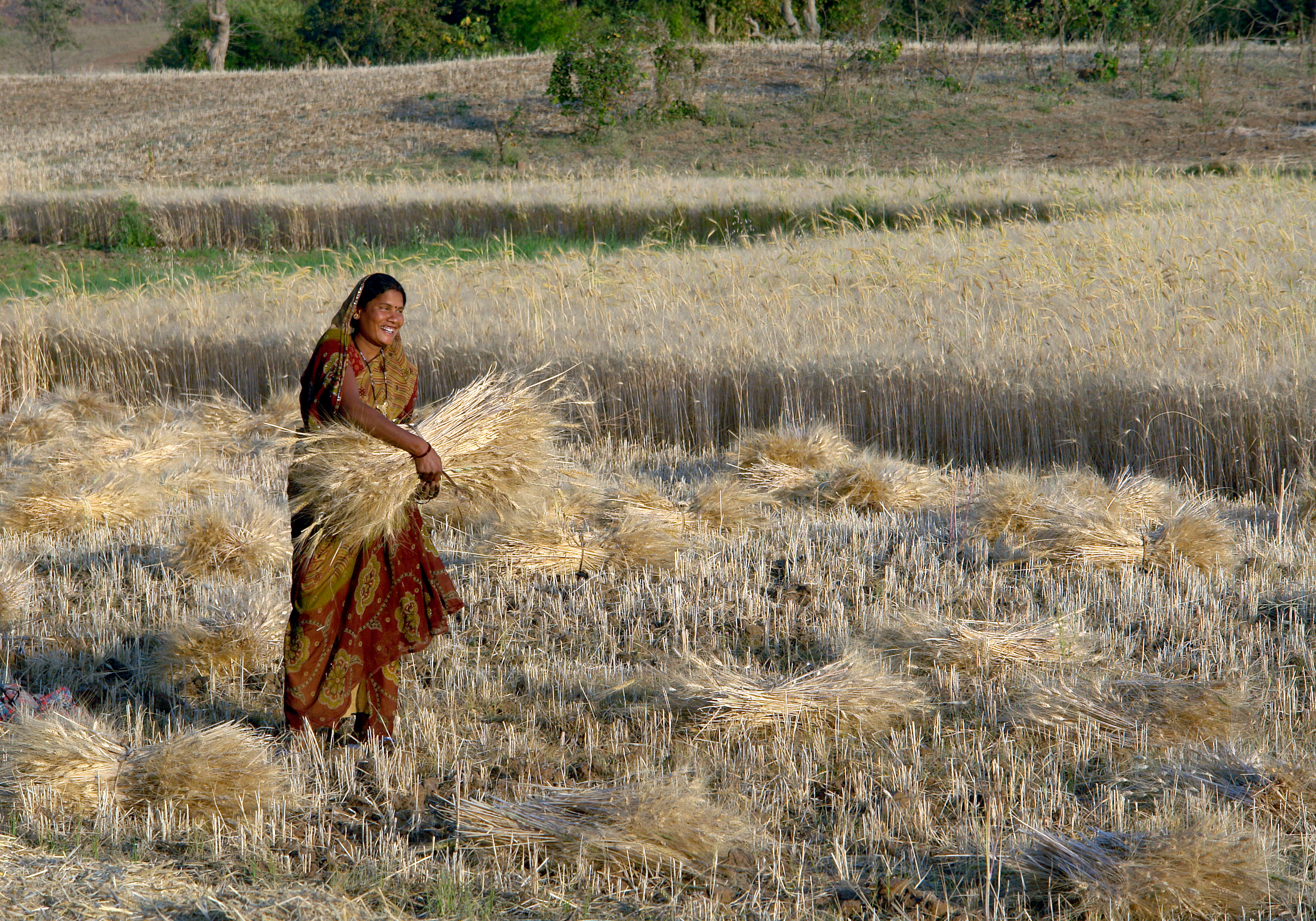
Most wheat produced in India, Pakistan, and Bangladesh goes toward chapati.

Chapati is the most consumed flatbread in the Indian subcontinent, and, according to food scientist Jalal Qarooni, in the world. It is frequently consumed in India, Pakistan, Bangladesh, Tibet, (Note: The equivalent of chapati in the Tibetan Plateau is known as tagi.) and Afghanistan. Nearly 90 percent of wheat produced in Pakistan, 80 to 85 percent of wheat produced in India, and most wheat produced in Bangladesh goes toward chapati. It is also eaten in most East African countries, a region with strong influence from Indian cuisine.

Chapati is commonly homemade in India and in Kenya. Large-scale settings of chapati production include restaurants and canteens. Mechanised production is relatively uncommon, and most commercial production is from informal producers that sell chapatis with a low shelf life in a limited area. Ready-to-eat chapati is produced as a convenience food, manufactured mechanically and distributed in individual packs. Grocery stores specialising in Indian food sell fresh chapati.

=== South Asia ===
Chapatis are a staple food in the Indian subcontinent, eaten in almost all households in India, with a role similar to that of pan bread in Western cuisine. A 2018 survey of rural parts of four Indian states found that three-quarters of households make chapati. It is an inexpensive source of nutrition in the country.

Chapati is a staple of North Indian, Western Indian, and Central Indian cuisine, Many North Indians eat it twice a day, and people in some parts of India consider it a requirement for a full meal, including in the Western Himalayas. North India is a wheat-dominated region, thus making wheat-based flatbreads common. Chapati is found in Punjabi cuisine, which spans India and Pakistan. Chapati, like other North Indian breads, is also found in Nepalese cuisine.

Eastern Indian cuisine primarily features rice, but many people's diets include both rice and chapati. This includes the Sikkim–Darjeeling region of the Eastern Himalayas, where rice is the main staple but chapati is common in urban areas. The cuisine of Uttarakhand, in the Central Himalayas, typically features rice for lunch and chapati for dinner. It is usually made of wheat in summer and finger millet in winter.

South Indian cuisine is dominated by rice, but wheat flatbreads such as chapati have become increasingly common by the 21st century. This shift has been driven by influence from the rest of the country as well as health concerns, as chapati has higher fibre content and a lower glycemic index than rice. Many South Indians eat chapati for one meal a day, though it is not as common to eat it twice. In the South Indian region of Coastal Andhra, chapati is eaten as breakfast, but is less common than South Indian idli or dosa. Chapati is common in the South Indian city of Hyderabad, despite being less common in surrounding rural areas.

In South Asian villages, chapati is more commonly homemade than purchased. Indian culture associates chapati-making with women's domestic gender roles and considers it a difficult craft. It has been considered an essential skill for a woman to be ready for married life, although many women instead purchase chapati. Chapati is purchased from manufacturers, stores, or catering services, often sold alongside vegetable curry. Some households hire cooks to regularly make chapati. Chapati is the most common meal packed as lunch or tiffin in India, paired with dal or vegetable curry, as workers and students in the country prefer to pack food prepared at home. Chapati is fed to babies in parts of India including Rajasthan. The Catholic Church in India uses chapati as sacramental bread for the Communion ritual, a localised adaptation established by the All India Liturgical Meeting of 1969.

=== East Africa ===
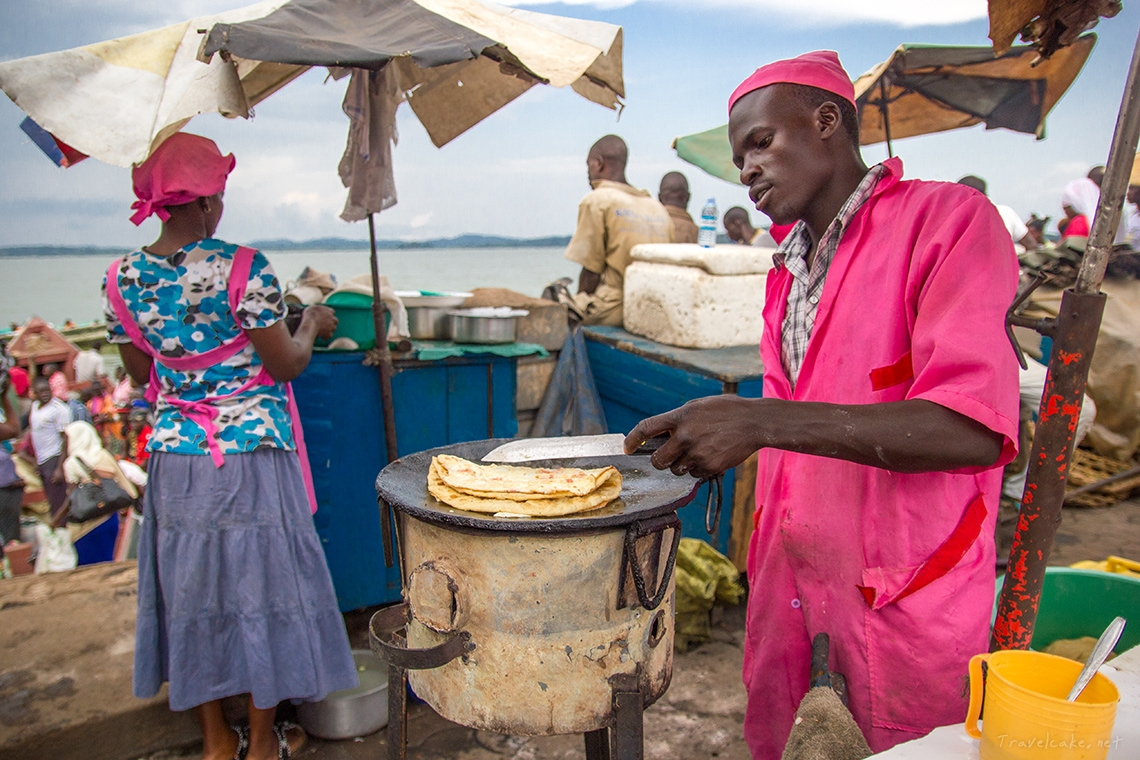
Chapati dishes such as rolex are common street foods in Uganda.

Chapati is common among all cultures in Kenya. It is one of the most common main courses in Kenyan urban areas, and Kenyan street vendors serve chapati wraps. Street vendors in Nairobi serve chapati with various accompaniments. In western Kenya, it is known as a snack eaten with tea, and it may be eaten for gatherings and special occasions. The Luo people of Kenya eat chapati as breakfast with tea or, less commonly, as dinner. Among the Embu community—to whom chapati was introduced by Indian shopkeepers—it is only eaten on special occasions. Maasai cuisine may pair it with tea or bean stew for lunch or with various dishes for dinner. Chapati is also eaten for Christmas in Kenya.

In Uganda, chapati may be eaten with tea for breakfast; it is a common breakfast in the city of Kampala. Urban fast food establishments serve chapati and other Indian dishes for lunch. Many street stalls in the country sell chapati and its derived dishes, rolex and kikomando. The two dishes are often sold by the same vendors.

Chapati is also eaten in all parts of Tanzania, including Dar es Salaam, where it is a snack or side dish, and Zanzibar, where it is a popular breakfast among young, working-class people. Chapati is the typical bread of Swahili cuisine. Similar breads exist in Somali cuisine.

=== Diaspora ===
Chapati is consumed by the South Asian diaspora, including in the United Kingdom and in the Middle East, as well as the Kenyan diaspora. As a staple food, chapati tends to have lasting consumption among migrant communities and is often seen as part of a cultural identity. According to food writer Vir Sanghvi, Indian restaurants in the Western world do not serve chapati as much as naan as customers are not used to the method of eating with the hands.

Chapati is a major part of the diet of Pakistanis in Europe. Pakistanis in Norway frequently eat homemade chapati, though some decrease their consumption due to a preference for Western-style bread or health concerns amid changing lifestyles. Chapati is sometimes made with white flour among immigrants in Europe, including Pakistanis in Norway. A survey in Birmingham, United Kingdom, found that Hindu and Sikh migrants eat chapati for breakfast more often than local dishes. Chapati is common in the cuisine of Yemen and of Oman. It is a typical breakfast dish in Oman, having become common in the country amid increased immigration between the 1990s and 2010s. It also exists in the cuisines of Bahrain and the United Arab Emirates, being sold by bakeries in Abu Dhabi. Indo-Malaysians eat chapati for breakfast. In the United States, naan and chapati are common but maintain an association with Indian cuisine.

== See also ==
- Indian bread
- List of flatbreads
- Tortilla – a similar flatbread
