= Ritesh R. Malik =

Indian physician

- Born: New Delhi, India
- Education: Theni Government Medical College; Tamil Nadu Dr. M.G.R. Medical University (MBBS)
- Occupations: Entrepreneur, physician

Ritesh R. Malik is an Indian physician-turned-entrepreneur. He founded Innov8 Coworking, a coworking company that OYO acquired in March 2019. In 2022, the World Economic Forum named him a Young Global Leader.

== Early life and education ==
Malik was born in New Delhi to Ravi and Renu Malik. He attended Delhi Public School, Mathura Road.

He studied at Theni Government Medical College in Tamil Nadu, affiliated with Tamil Nadu Dr. M.G.R. Medical University, and received an MBBS degree in 2013. He completed his internship at Sir Ganga Ram Hospital in Delhi.

== Career ==
Malik founded Innov8 Coworking in 2015. The company was accepted into Y Combinator's Summer 2016 batch. Its first location, a 105-seat facility in Connaught Place, New Delhi, opened in January 2016. The company later added locations in Bengaluru and Gurugram. Early angel investors included Paytm founder Vijay Shekhar Sharma and Freshworks founder Girish Mathrubootham.

By March 2019, Innov8 operated 16 centres across Delhi, Noida, Gurugram, Bengaluru, Chandigarh, and Mumbai, with more than 200 employees. OYO acquired the company that month for US$31.84 million to form its OYO Workspaces division. By the end of 2019, OYO Workspaces had more than 60 centres across India.

In 2020, Malik established The Mangrove Holdings, a family office, The firm operates several businesses, including Radix Healthcare, a company established by his parents in 2003.

Malik co-founded Plaksha University, a private university in Mohali, Punjab, and serves as a trustee.

In 2020, he co-founded the Alliance of Digital India Foundation (ADIF), a trade body for Indian digital startups, with Sairee Chahal of Sheroes and Murugavel Janakiraman of BharatMatrimony. He is a board member of the Netaji Subhas University of Technology, a Delhi Government-led public institution.

In April 2025, Malik was appointed to the Business Circle of the MIT Kuo Sharper Center for Prosperity and Entrepreneurship at the Massachusetts Institute of Technology.

== Awards and honours ==
| Year | Award | Awarding body |
|---|---|---|
| 2016 | Forbes Asia 30 Under 30/Fortune India 40 Under 40 | Forbes, Fortune India |
| 2022 | Young Global Leader | World Economic Forum |
| 2026 | Avendus Wealth – Hurun India U40 List 2025 | Hurun India |
