= Angry Brides =

2012 video game

- Developer: Shaadi.com
- Platform: Facebook
- Genre: Simulation
- Mode: Single-player

Angry Brides is an online flash-based browser game on Facebook. It was launched by the matchmaking site Shaadi.com to help raise awareness of dowry harassment in India.

== Background ==
In India, dowry is the payment in cash or other valuable property given to a bridegroom's family along with the bride. A typical dowry may include cash and jewellery. Requests for and payment of dowry were prohibited under the Dowry Prohibition Act (1961) in Indian civil law and subsequently by Sections 304B and 498A of the Indian Penal Code (IPC), but the practice still continues, illegally.

If a demanded payment is not made, the groom's family might harass or even kill the bride, often by setting her clothing on fire. The Indian police report that every year they receive over 2,500 reports of bride-burning. The National Crime Records Bureau of the Ministry of Home Affairs, Government of India, reports that there were about 8,172 dowry death cases registered in India in 2008. This represents an increase of 14.4% over the 1998 level (7,146). According to Ram Bhamidi, senior vice president of Shaadi.com, the Facebook game was developed to raise awareness of the issue.

== Game ==
The landing page of the game shows an eight-armed woman, clad in red and resembling the powerful female Hindu goddess Durga. Underneath her is a caption: "A woman will give you strength, care and all the love you need ... NOT dowry!" The game involves throwing various common household items like frying pans, rolling pins, broomsticks, and stiletto heels. In Angry Brides, players strike target grooms who demand a large dowry. Each hit lowers the amount demanded and if the player manages to bring the dowry to zero, they can proceed to the next level. The dowry-demanding grooms are portrayed as a doctor, an engineer or a pilot. The dowry demand starts at ₹ 1.5 millions (about US$30,000 or GBP18,000) and goes down with each successful hit.

== Reaction ==
The game was originally meant to be played on Facebook, but Shaadi.com announced its intentions of bringing it out on other platforms citing its success. The page got 270,000 fans on Facebook who believed that it would help spread awareness about various social evils.

== See also ==
- Dowry death
- Bride burning
