= Wisdom Jobs =

- Type: Private
- Industry: Recruitment
- Founded: 2010
- Founder: Ajay Kolla
- Headquarters: Hyderabad, India
- Website: www.wisdomjobs.com

Wisdom Jobs is an employment website operating in India, Middle-East & North Africa. It claims that it is one of three major job portals in India, along with Naukri.com and Monster.com, and supposedly provides skill-tested and assessed job seekers. The company is headquartered in Hyderabad, India.

== History ==
Wisdomjobs.com was founded in 2010 by Ajay Kolla. Kolla initially started a Google group, where he posted vacancies, to assist his unemployed friends for job placements. Between 2008 and 2010, the group placed nearly 20,000 people, which led Kolla to see a potential market for an online student job marketplace that could help in connecting students with trusted professional employers. He invested 3.5 million Indian Rupees in the venture and the job portal was launched as Wisdomjobs.com with an online skill testing tool, Pragnya Meter, that helps job seekers to test and quantify their skills.

=== Growth ===
Since inception, the company has developed a database of over 35 million job seekers and clientele base of over 3,500 recruiters in India, the Middle East, and North America. Wisdom jobs also cheats people by taking a ransom from job seekers in name of security deposit and won't return it. dep

== Products and services ==
- Pragnya Meter — An online candidate assessment tool that helps in screening and filtering the applicants based on the score they attain in the test.
- VConnect — A voice broadcasting tool for recruiters
- HR's Hub — An applicant tracking system
- Quick Source — A custom sourcing service.

== Awards and recognition ==
- Wisdomjobs.com was listed in ASSOCHAM India's Top SME 50 Index and received the Certificate of Excellence for its outstanding performance in the year 2015-16
