= Policybazaar =

Indian insurance aggregator

Policybazaar Insurance Brokers Private Limited
- Type: Public
- Traded as: NSE: POLICYBZR; BSE: 543390
- ISIN: INE417T01026
- Industry: Financial technology; Insurance
- Founded: July 2008; 18 years ago in Gurgaon
- Founders: Yashish Dahiya; Alok Bansal; Avaneesh Nirjar
- Headquarters: Plot No. 119, Sector 44, Gurgaon, Haryana, India
- Areas served: India; UAE
- Products: Insurance
- Services: Insurance aggregation; Insurance broking
- Revenue: ▲₹34.38 billion (US$360 million) (FY24)
- Operating income: ▲₹3.24 billion (US$34 million) (FY24)
- Net income: ▲₹640 million (US$6.6 million) (FY24)
- Parent: PB Fintech Ltd.
- Website: www.policybazaar.com

Policybazaar is an Indian insurance aggregator and multinational financial technology company based in Gurgaon. The corporation was established in June 2008 by Yashish Dahiya, Alok Bansal and Avaneesh Nirjar. It provides a digital platform, consisting of a website and mobile application, where users can compare insurance policies and other financial services from major insurance companies. The company is India's largest insurance aggregator, and has expanded its operations to the United Arab Emirates.

Policybazaar operates as the flagship subsidiary of PB Fintech Ltd., which also owns the credit product marketplace Paisabazaar.

== History ==
Policybazaar.com was founded in June 2008 by Yashish Dahiya, Alok Bansal, and Avaneesh Nirjar, initially operating as an insurance comparison website. At that time, the Indian insurance industry lacked transparency, and policies were mostly sold through agents. Policybazaar started by listing the details of multiple insurance policies for customers to choose from. It began as a price-comparison website, and an information portal for learning about insurance and insurance programs. The website subsequently expanded to become a marketplace for insurance policies. In 2015, Policybazaar launched its app for Android and iOS users.

In February 2020, Sarbvir Singh was appointed CEO, effective December 2019, while Yashish Dahiya took over the role of group CEO.

In June 2021, Policybazaar obtained an insurance broking licence from IRDAI and announced that it would set up 100 offline outlets across India. The company also surrendered its web aggregator licence.

Policybazaar (parent company PB Fintech) was listed on the stock exchange on November 15, 2021. The shares debuted on both the National Stock Exchange (NSE) and the Bombay Stock Exchange (BSE).

== Operations ==
According to a Frost & Sullivan report, PolicyBazar holds a 93% market share among digital insurance platforms in India. By the end of FY24, Policybazar recorded over 16.6 million unique insurance buyers since its inception.

== Products ==
In 2021, Policybazaar moved from a policy price comparison website to an insurance selling operation. The company claims to process nearly 25% of India's life insurance and over 7% of the country's retail health cover.

Policybazaar.com has tie-ups with insurance companies that help it procure information such as prices, benefits, insurance cover, etc. directly from the insurers. Users can use the Policybazaar website or app to research, compare and buy insurance policies from over 40 insurance providers. Policybazaar has companies that offer car insurance, health insurance, life insurance, corporate insurance, and travel insurance as its business partners.

The Insurance Regulatory And Development Authority of India regulates the insurance web aggregation business of Policybazaar. The company is registered as an insurance web aggregator under the Insurance Web Aggregator Regulations, 2017.

== Funding ==
Info Edge invested ₹300 million (US$6.9 million) as the seed funding in Policybazaar in mid-2008. Intel Capital and Info Edge invested ₹600 million (US$12.86 million) in Policybazaar in May 2011 as part of the venture round.

Policybazaar raised $9 million from Intel Capital and Inventus Capital Partners in its Series A funding round. Policybazaar raised US$5 million in its third round of funding in April 2013. This Series B investment was led by Inventus Capital Partners along with Info Edge and Intel Capital. In May 2014, Policybazaar.com raised $20 million in a Series C round of funding from existing investors including Tiger Global Management.

Policybazaar raised around US$40 million in its Series D round of funding in April 2015 from Premji Invest, the personal investment vehicle of Wipro chairman Azim Premji. The Series D also attracted money from Steadview Capital and ABG Capital. Policybazaar raised US$77 million in its Series E funding round. This was led by at least three new investors, including True North and IDG Venture Partners invested in this round. Also, several media reports claimed that Boston-based asset management firm Wellington Management Group invested in the online insurance aggregator.

Policybazaar raised a total of US$238 million in June 2018 in its series F funding and became a unicorn company. Tokyo-based SoftBank Group's Vision fund led the round with its US$150 million investment that gave it a 15% stake in the parent company of Policybazaar, ETechAces Marketing and Consulting. The Series F investment saw Info Edge put in $45 million in the company through a special purpose vehicle, effectively lifting its stake to 13% from 9%. In November 2019, Tencent acquired a 10% stake in the company at a valuation of $1.5 billion. SoftBank invested an additional $130 million to increase its stake to 15% in July 2020, valuing Policybazaar at around U$1.5 billion.

In November 2021, PB Fintech Ltd., the parent company of Policybazaar, opened its initial public offering (IPO) and raised ₹56.25 billion (US$760.98 million). Shares of PB Fintech Ltd. began trading on National Stock Exchange and Bombay Stock Exchange on 15 November 2021.

== Controversies ==
In early 2019, Policybazaar filed an intellectual property case against insurance company Acko General Insurance and Coverfox Insurance Broking Private Limited for trademark infringement.

In May 2021, the Insurance Regulatory and Development Authority of India (IRDAI) imposed a fine of ₹2.4 million (US$25,000) on Policybazaar for flouting norms related to SMS advertising.

In July 2022, PB Fintech disclosed that part of Policybazaar's IT systems had been accessed without authorisation after vulnerabilities were identified. The company said the vulnerabilities had been fixed and an audit had begun, and that its initial review found no significant customer data had been exposed. Cybersecurity firm CyberX9 later claimed that the incident affected about 56.4 million customers, including defence personnel. On 6 December 2023, Policybazaar sends defamation notice to insurance review platform Beshak Solutions Private Limited.

GST officials raided PB Fintech's Gurugram office on 13 January 2025, focusing on vendors linked to its subsidiary, PB Partners, which manages offline insurance distribution for Policybazaar. The company confirmed full cooperation with authorities and stated no financial impact from the raid. Further details remain undisclosed.
