= Rolex (food) =

Ugandan street food

Ugandan Rolex, commonly referred to as Rolex, is a popular food item in Uganda prepared by combining an egg omelette and vegetables wrapped in a chapati. This single-portion dish is quick to prepare, and can be eaten at any time of the day, from breakfast to a lunch or supper meal or snack. The name "rolex" comes from its method of preparation, with the chapati and the omelette rolled together ("rolled eggs").

This idea originated from a chapati seller's creativity in the Busoga region "the basoga" then the idea spread to Wandegeya next to Makerere University in Uganda, fueled by students who needed a quick meal because of time and budget limitations.

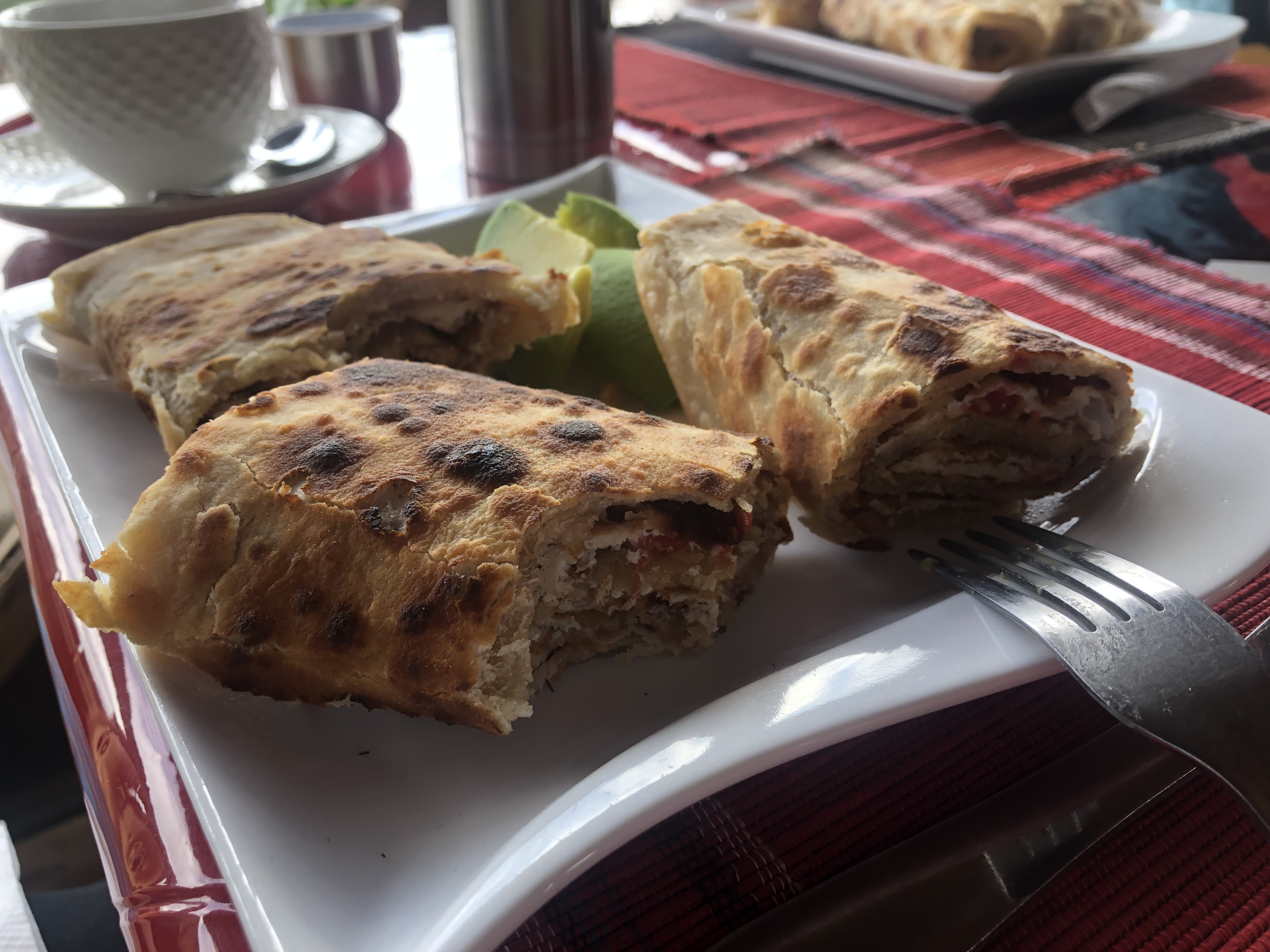
Rolex breakfast wrap from Mbale, Uganda

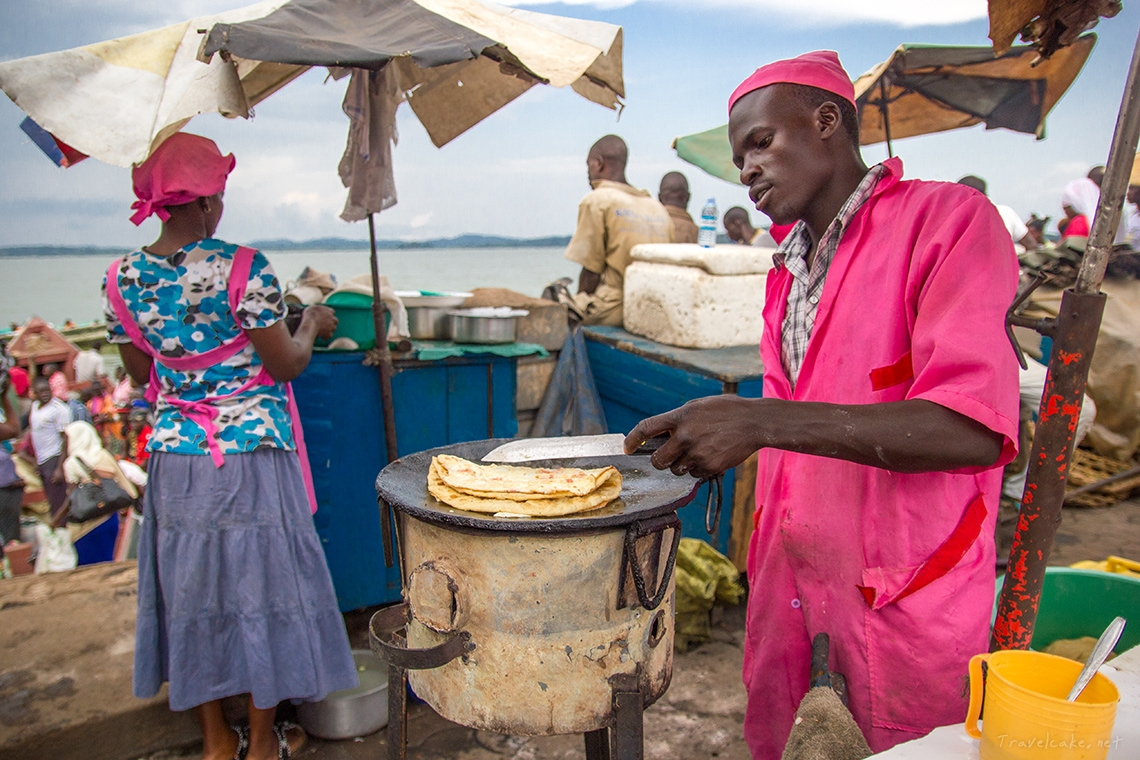
A "Rolex" merchant frying chapatis

The delicacy soon spread throughout Uganda. It became a popular food choice for its combination of convenience, low cost, and taste.

Other terms and variations related to rolex include:

- "Titanic": two or more chapatis used together in rolling the portion.
- "Kikomando": the chapati is sliced and mixed with beans. This name is inspired by the commando soldier or unit eating quickly in the field. It can also refer to someone unafraid of getting messy by eating street food with their hands.

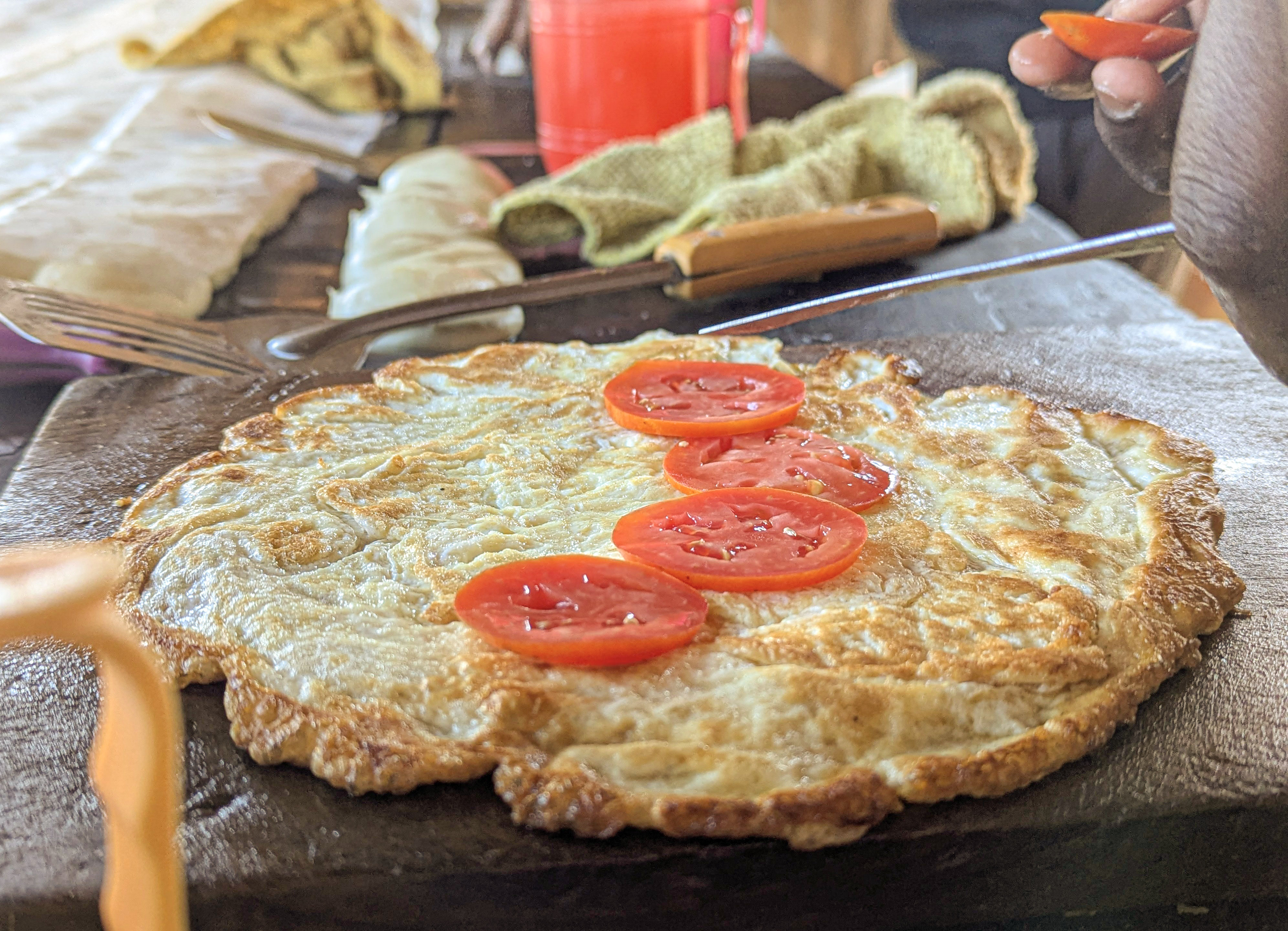
Rolex

The globalization of the world is shaking even such traditional local products. In 2022, the price of a rolex rose sharply due to the Russo-Ukrainian War and its escalation of the prices of wheat flour and cooking oil. Ugandan President Yoweri Museveni unpopularly suggested that the public stop complaining about the rising price and eat cassava instead.

== Tourism ==
The rolex, which is sold for as low as USh 1,000/= (US$0.28), is largely consumed in urban areas as a fast food and has been promoted by authorities as a global tourist attraction.
