= BharatMatrimony =

Indian matchmaking service

- Founded: 12 March 2000
- Founder: Murugavel Janakiraman
- Headquarters: Chennai, India
- Area served: Worldwide
- Parent: Matrimony.com
- Website: www.bharatmatrimony.com

BharatMatrimony is an online matrimonial service and a part of Matrimony.com. It was founded in 2000 by Murugavel Janakiraman, who later met his wife through his own matrimonial site. The company has 130 offices in India, with offices in Dubai, Sri Lanka, United States and Malaysia to cater to customers beyond India.

== History ==
Murugavel Janakiraman started the BharatMatrimony website in 2000 while working as a software consultant for Lucent Technologies in Edison, N.J. In the late 1990s he set up a Tamil community web portal, which included matrimonial ads. He started BharatMatrimony after noticing the matrimonial ads generated most of his web traffic. He returned to India in 2004.

The company introduced features on their website like Matchboard, SoulMate Search, AstroMatch, and Express Interest to help customers make the right matches.

In 2006, the website earned into the Limca Book of World Records for having facilitated the highest number of documented marriages online in India, a number that has since reached one million marriages.

In 2009, BharatMatrimony launched more than 200 community portals, aimed at specific language groups and communities. The company launched more portals in 2010 aimed at Malaysian and Singaporean Tamils. BharatMatrimony operated in more than 14 regional languages. Another portal was aimed at defence personnel.

In 2014, BharatMatrimony entered into talks with several telecom companies in order to launch its Interactive Voice Response (IVR) matrimonial service. BharatMatrimony users would use the IVR service to send and receive voice messages from prospective matches on their mobile devices.

=== Assisted Matrimony ===
Assisted Matrimony is a personalized matchmaking service from BharatMatrimony, offered for busy Indian professionals who need assistance in finding a match. BharatMatrimony started the personal assisted service in 2008 with the launch of BM Privilege. This was then renamed Privilege Matrimony in 2009.

== See also ==
- Matrimony.com
- Elite Matrimony
- Jeevansathi.com
- Shaadi.com
