= Wheat production in India =

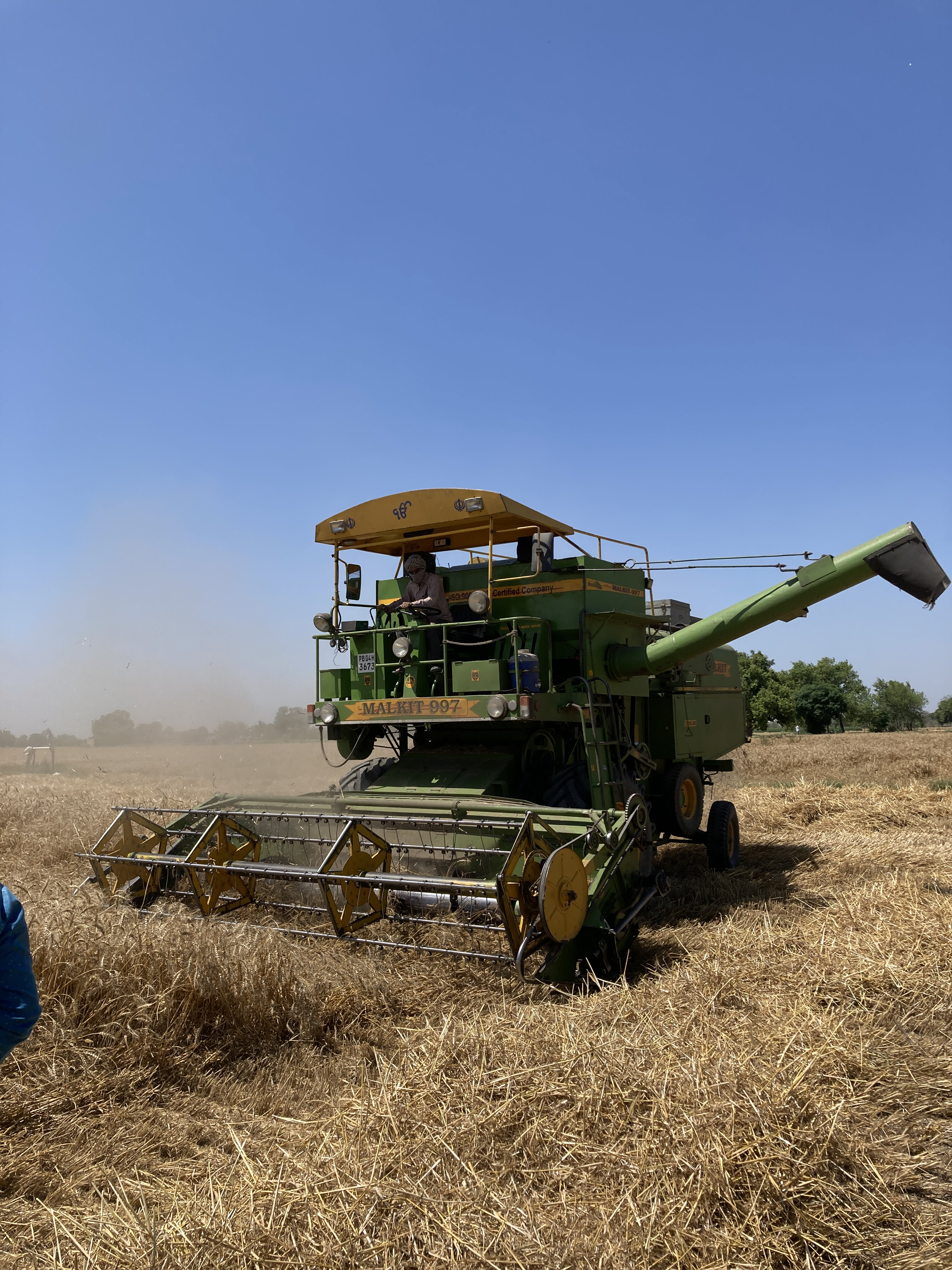
Wheat harvester in Punjab

Most of India's wheat is produced in the northwestern part of Indo-Gangetic plains. India is the second-largest producer of wheat in the world. Climate change has impacted the production of wheat in India. India has banned the exportation of wheat.

== Geography ==
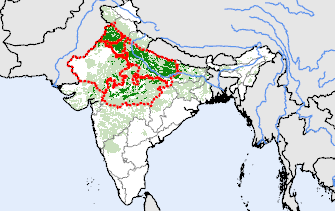
80% of India's total wheat production from October to April 2025.

Most of India's wheat is produced in the northwestern part of Indo-Gangetic plains. Most of India's wheat is produced in States of Uttar Pradesh, Punjab, Haryana, and Madhya Pradesh.

== Production ==
Punjab produces 18% of India's wheat, which has led to the state getting the title of “Granary of India". Since the green revolution Punjab's wheat production has tripled. As of November 14, 2025, wheat was planted on 6.62 million hectares of land in India. As of 2025, India is the second largest producer of wheat in the world.

A study by the International Journal of Molecular Sciences found that heat stress caused by climate change led to a reduction in grain production and grain quality due to damage to the natural processes of the plant. A report by the Department of Agriculture and Farmers Welfare showed that for every increase of one degree Celsius, wheat production drops by 4-5 million tons. As of 2025, the summer crop season has been starting late, which causes the late stages of the wheat plant's growth to coincide with the first of India's annual heat waves. The high temperature causes the wheat flower early and ripen faster, which leads to lower wheat production.

== Policy ==
After the Russian invasion of Ukraine, India prohibited the exportation of wheat. The prohibition was in response to the lack of availability of wheat, price increases of wheat due to the invasion, and a sharp rise of temperature that led to crops dying. The Directorate General of Foreign Trade later clarified that it was allowing wheat exports as humanitarian aid on a case-by-case basis.

India created a policy to distribute free wheat grain to 810 million people for 5 years with 18.4 million tons of wheat from its reserve, which was enacted on January 1, 2024. India purchased 18.8 million tons of wheat produced domestically in 2022, which was 53% less than the previous year. 80% of wheat purchased by India from their farmers shrived up. India has enacted a 40% import tax on wheat.
