= Sanjeev Bikhchandani =

Indian businessman

- Education: BA from St. Stephen's College, Delhi; Delhi University; MBA from IIM Ahmedabad
- Occupation: Entrepreneur
- Organization: InfoEdge
- Awards: Padma Shri
- Website: https://www.infoedge.in/

Sanjeev Bikhchandani is an Indian businessman, who is the founder and executive vice chairman of Info Edge which owns Naukri.com, a job portal, as well as the co-founder of Ashoka University. He was honored with the Padma Shri, India's fourth-highest civilian award, in January 2020.

== Early life and education ==
He was born in 1963 to a Sindhi family in Delhi.He attended St. Columba's School, Delhi and finished schooling from there in 1981. Thereafter, he obtained a Bachelor of Arts degree in economics from St. Stephen's College, Delhi in 1984. He completed his MBA from IIM Ahmedabad in 1989.

== Career ==
After his post graduation, Sanjeev did a job marketing Horlicks at Hindustan Milkfood Manufacturers (after series of multinational mergers-and-acquisitions, now known as GlaxoSmithKline Consumer Healthcare India) and left in 1990 to pursue entrepreneurship. In 1993, he and his partner decided to go separate ways. Sanjeev founded Info Edge in 1995. In 1997, Bikhchandani set up Naukri.com, jobs portal located on a server in India, and later Quadrangle.in, an offline executive search business. In 2005, Naukri.com was reported as being India's largest web-based employment site.

Info Edge later launched other classified sites like 99acres.com in real estate, Jeevansathi.com in matrimony and Shiksha.com in education.

He is also a member of the Vision Circle of the Foundation for Young Innovators (FYI), an initiative that supports social entrepreneurship among high school students.

== Recognition ==
He won the Ernst and Young Entrepreneur of the Year Award in 2008.

He is ranked #68 in Forbes India Rich List 2020 with a net worth of $2.1 Billion.

As per Forbes list of India’s 100 richest tycoons, dated October 9, 2024, Sanjeev Bikhchandani & family are ranked 75th with a net worth of $4.25 Billion.

Sanjeev is mentioned as one of the first Indian dotcom founders of the 21st century.
