= Rolling pin =

Kitchen utensil

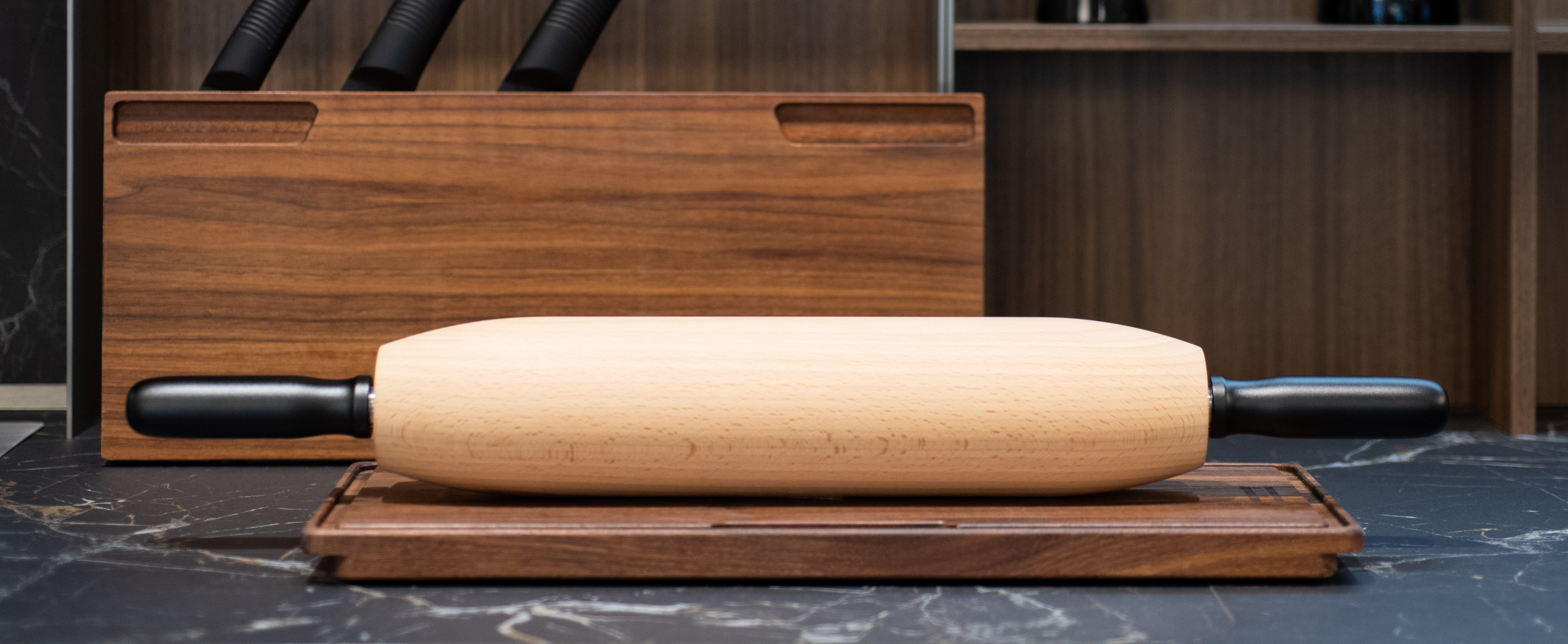
A Hybrid rolling pin design that combines the features of Rod and Roller pins by Rolling Wonder

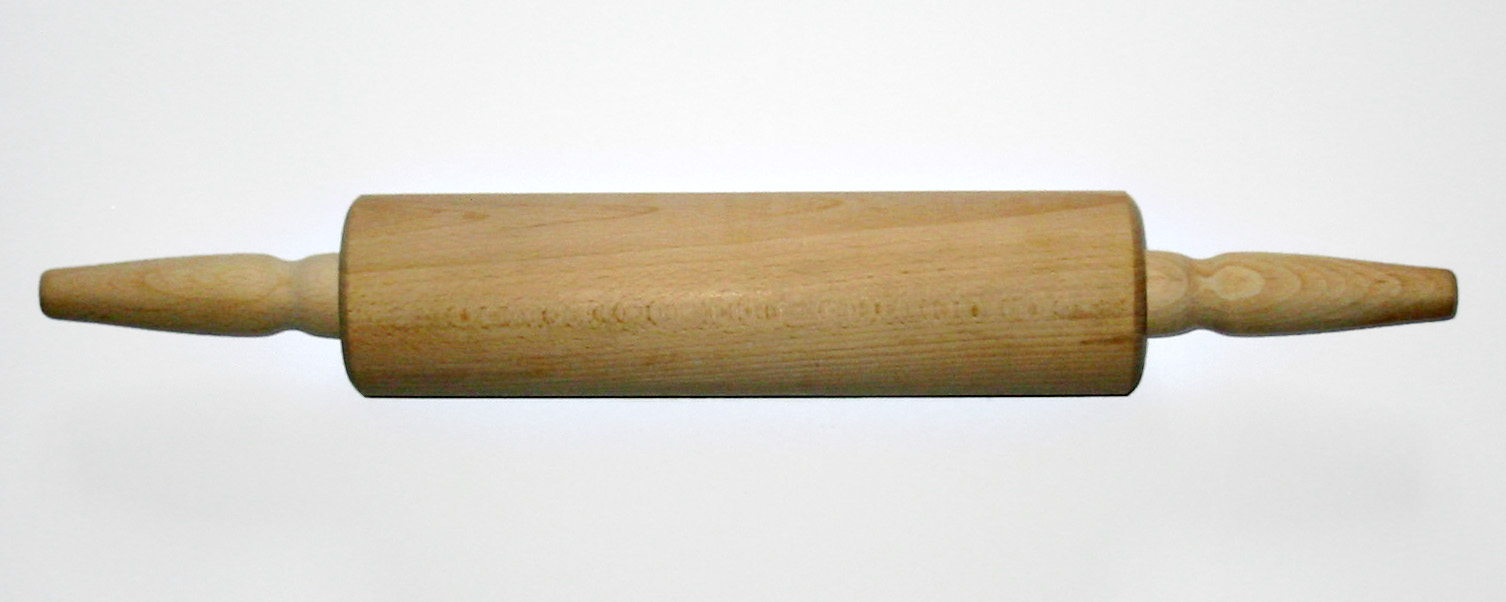
A wooden "roller" type rolling pin

Atta dough being rolled with a rolling pin during the preparation of chapati

A rolling pin is a cylindrical food preparation utensil used to shape and flatten dough. Two styles of rolling pin are found: rollers and rods. Roller types consists of a thick cylinder with small handles at each end; rod type rolling pins are usually thin tapered batons. Rolling pins of different styles and materials offer varying advantages, as they are used for different tasks in cooking and baking.

== Types of rolling pins ==
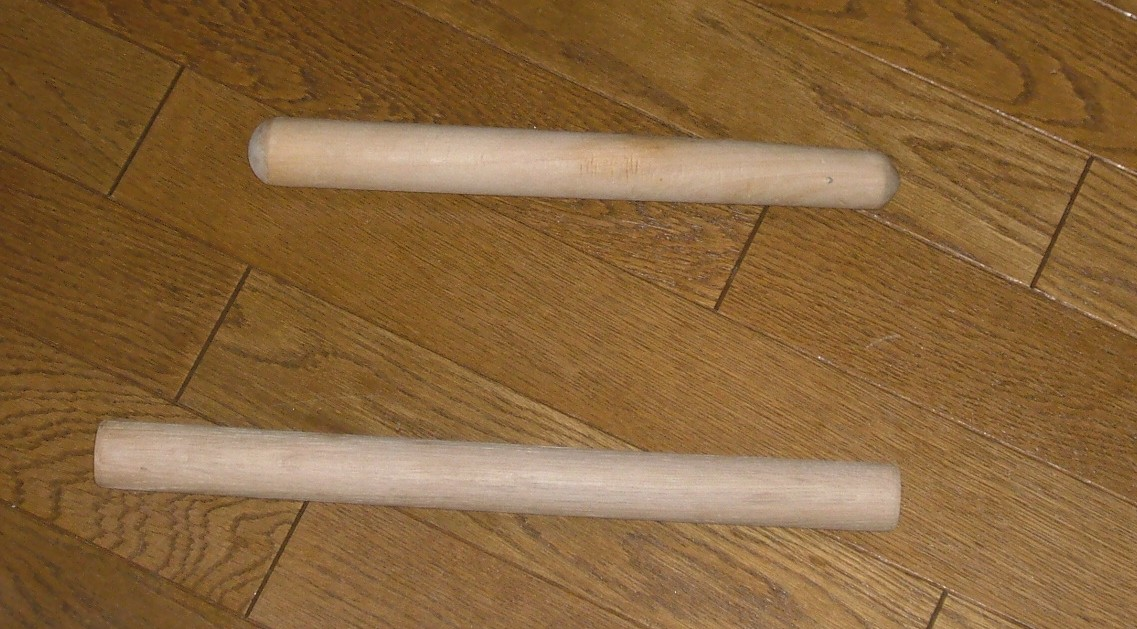
A tapered (top) and straight (bottom) "rod" type rolling pins

- Rod: thin rods typically made of wood around 1–2 inches (2–3 cm) in diameter. They are used by rolling the rod across the dough using one's palm. The pins may be tapered at one or both ends for more pivot control in certain tasks such as making small jiaozi skins or pie shells. Most East Asian or French style rolling pins, and the Turkish Oklava are rod-style.
- Roller: consists of a thick heavy roller made of a variety of materials around 3–4 inches (7–10 cm) in diameter with thinner handles which extend through the roller. They are used by grasping the handles and pushing the pin across the dough. Many Western rolling pins are roller types.
- Hybrid: a newer type of rolling pin combines features of both the Rod and Roller designs. Hybrid rolling pins, such as the Rolling Wonder, feature tapered ends for precision and control, akin to French rolling pins, while incorporating mechanisms like ball bearings for smoother rolling, as seen in American designs. This combination aims to offer versatility and enhanced handling for bakers.
- Textured: some specialized rolling pins have textured surfaces that mark and indents the dough surfaces for special breads and pancakes. They may even be embossed with writing.

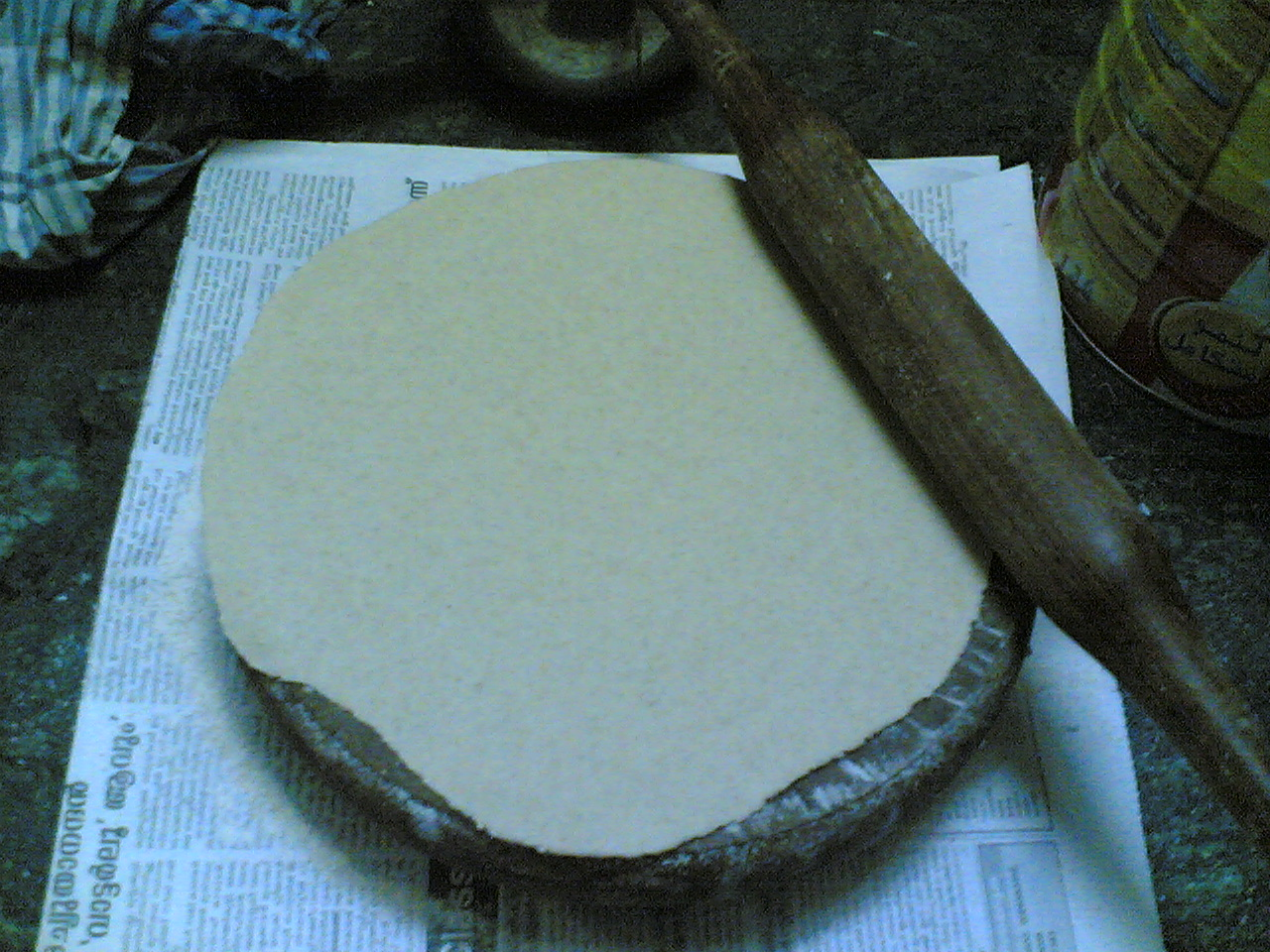
A wooden belan rolling pin is used on a round chakla to make chapatis.

- Chakla belan: in Indian cuisine, the rolling pin (belan) is used in combination with a chakla (flat circular rolling board). The dough for chapatis is rolled on the chakla with the help of the belan. Devices like Rotimatic and Rotillicious combine the functions of chakla, belan and round electric cooking griddle also known as tava.

== Material ==
Rolling pins come in a variety of sizes, shapes and materials including glass, ceramic, acrylic, bakelite, copper, brass, aluminium, silicone, wood, stainless steel, marble, and plastic. Some are hollow and are able to be filled with cold or warm water to better roll a desired food. Marble rolling pins are often cooled in a refrigerator for maintaining a cold dough while making puff pastry.

Rolling pins

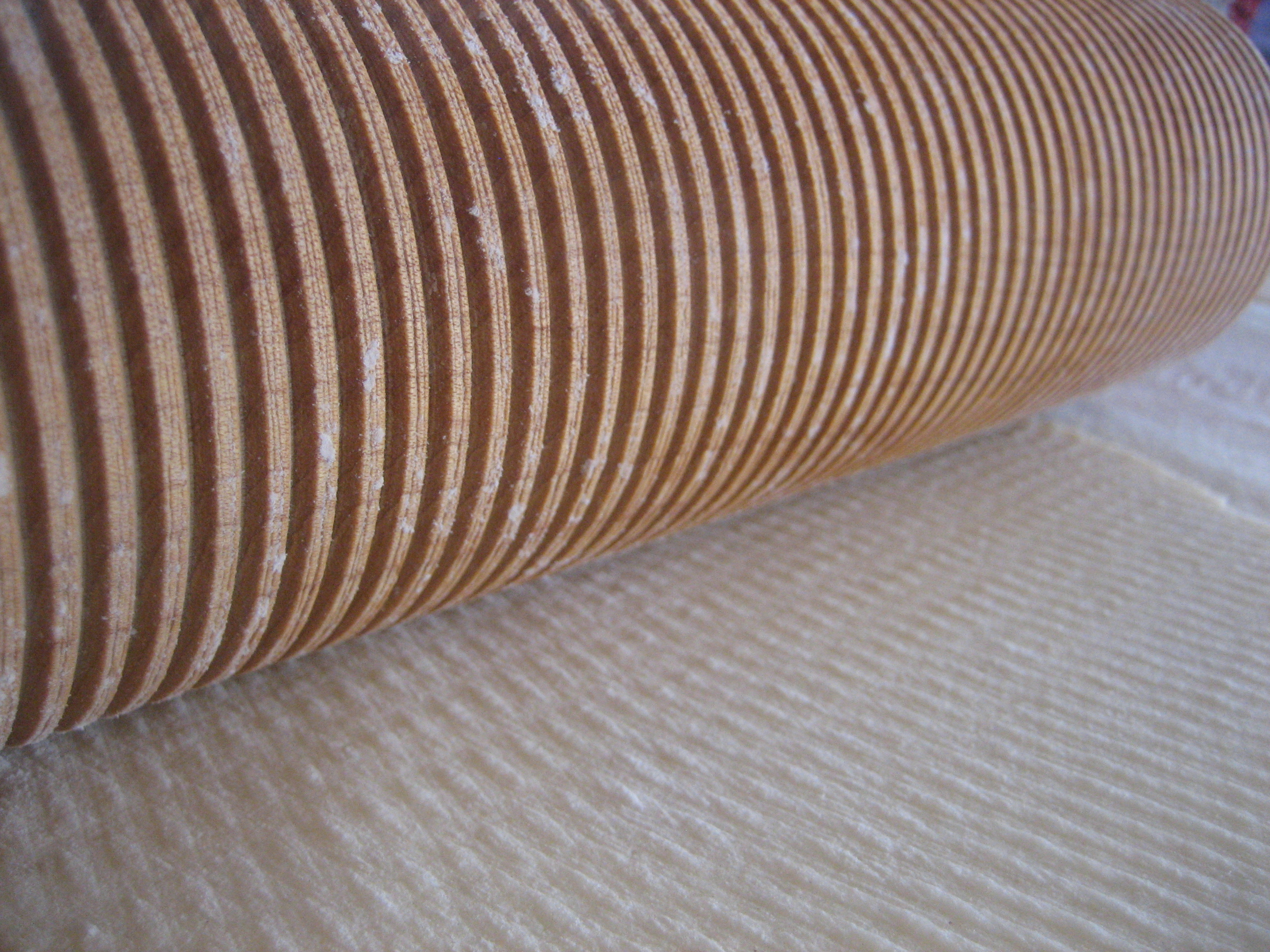
Striated rolling pin surface for making Norwegian Lefse

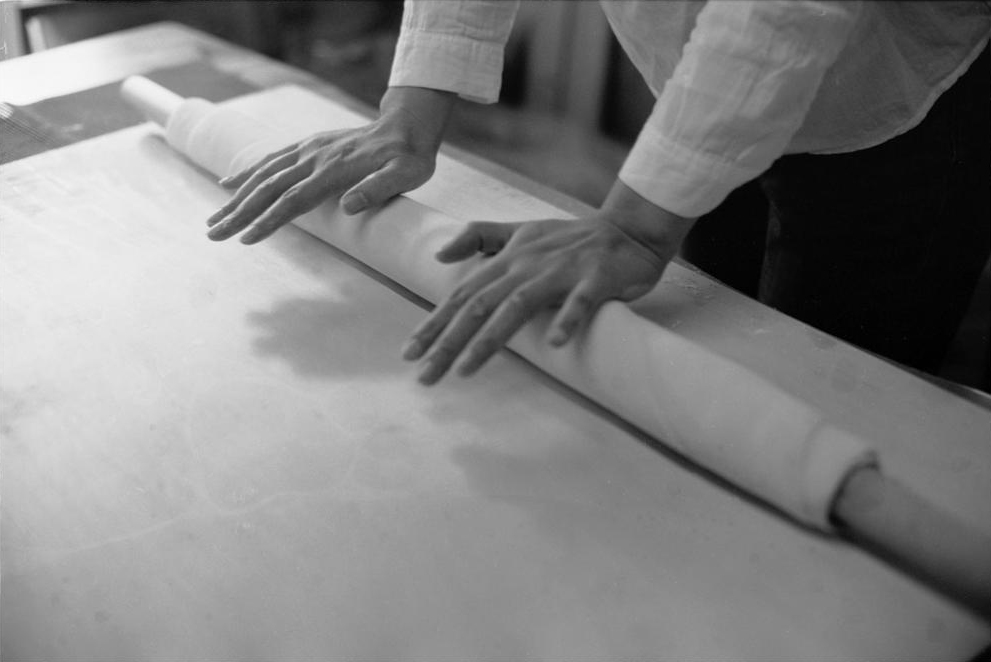
Long rolling pin used for making Japanese udon noodles

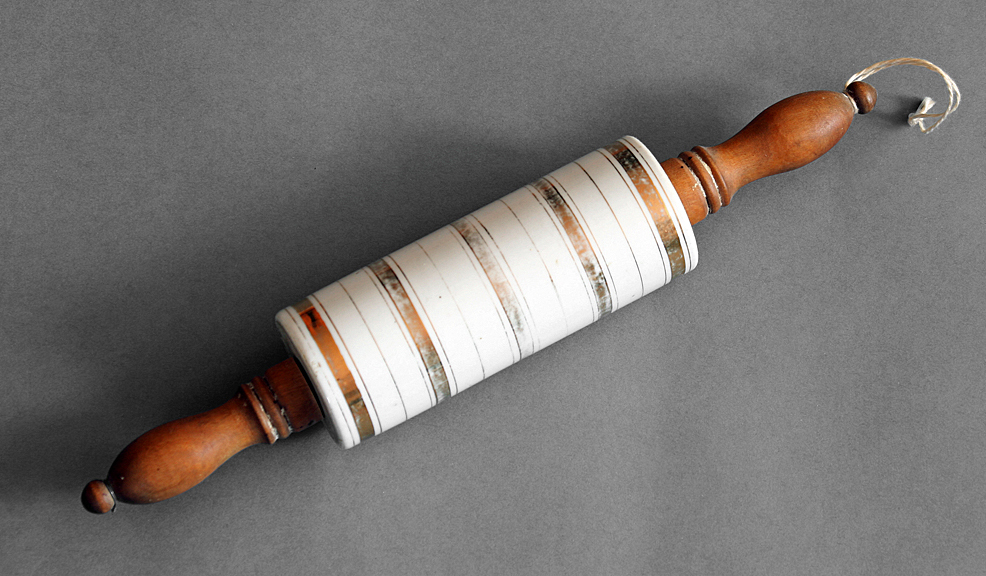
A small porcelain rolling pin from Germany

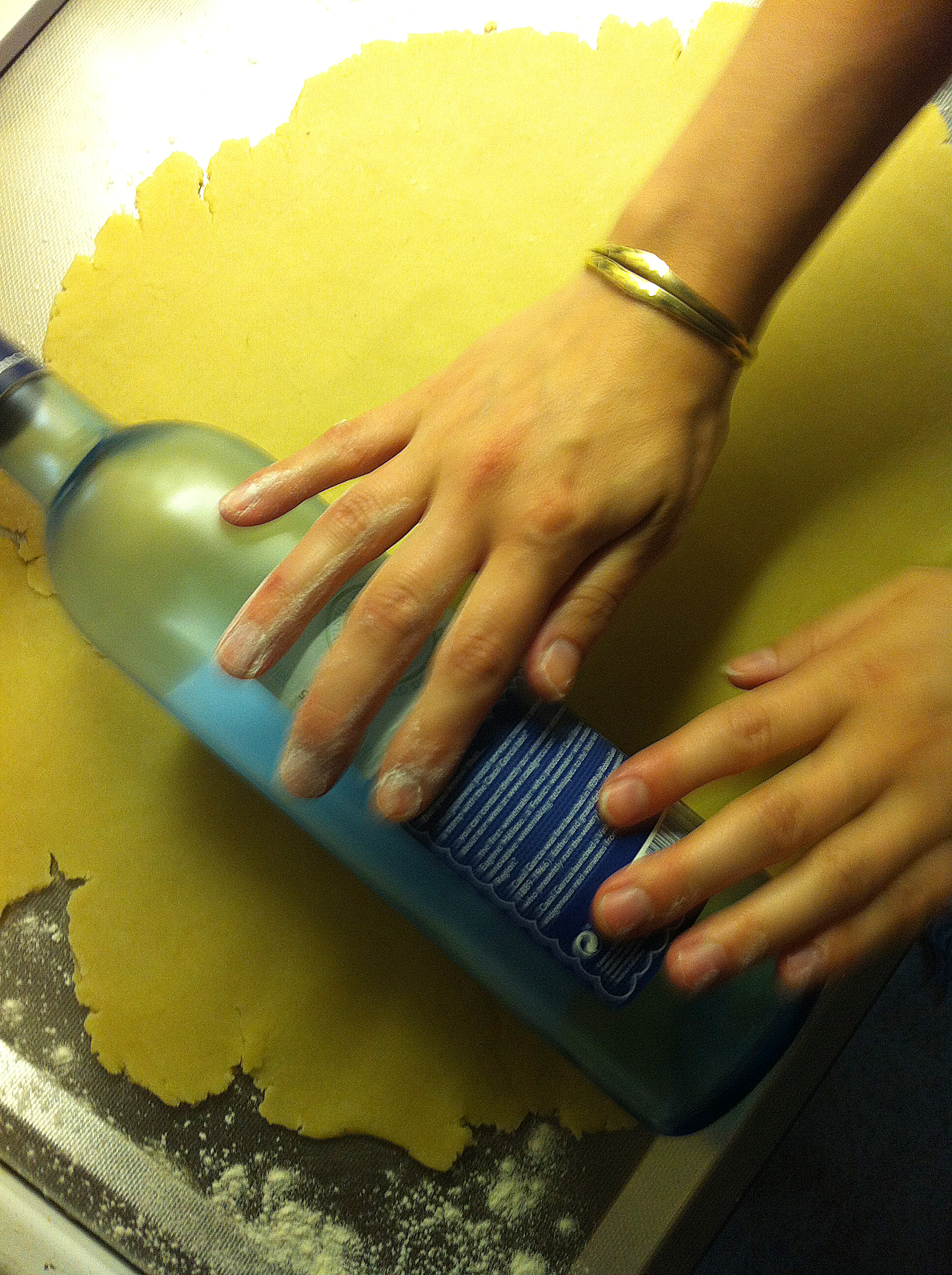
A wine bottle used as a rolling pin

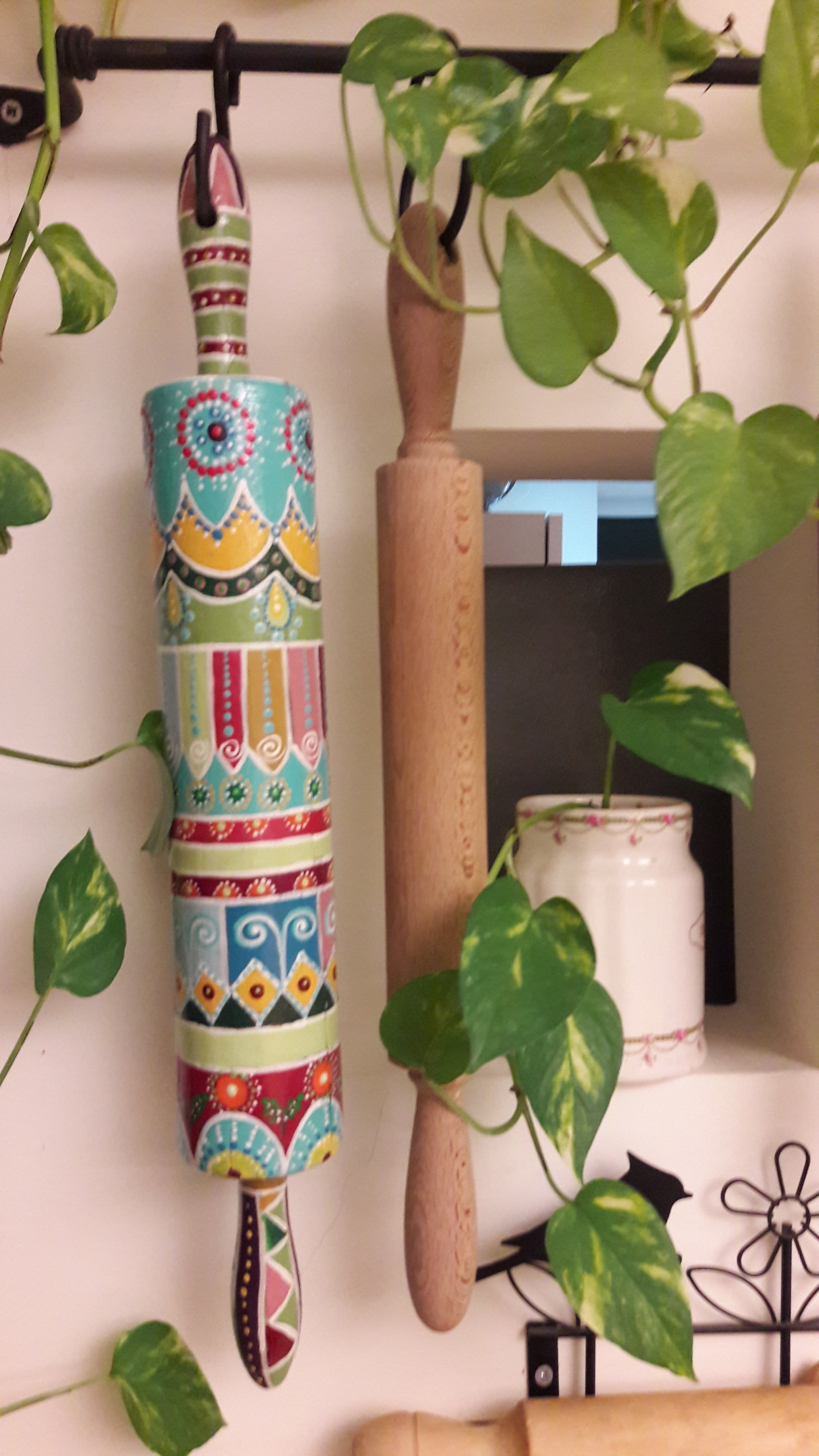
Rolling pins

== In popular culture ==
An angry housewife wielding a rolling pin as a weapon is a common cliché in humour, as, for example, in the English comic strip Andy Capp.

== See also ==
- Kneading
- Roller docker
