= Naukri.com =

Indian employment website

- Website type: Job search engine
- Available in: English
- Founded: March 1997; 29 years ago
- Headquarters: Noida, India
- Area served: India
- Founder: Sanjeev Bikhchandani
- Industry: Internet
- Products: Resume Database, Job Postings, Branding, e-Apps, Career Site Manager, Cloud Products
- Services: Online employment
- Parent: Info Edge
- Website: www.naukri.com
- Commercial: Yes
- Registration: Required
- Current status: Active

Naukri.com is an Indian employment website which operates in India and the Middle East. It was founded in March 1997 by Sanjeev Bikhchandani as a division of Info Edge. Naukri.com is the largest employment website in India.

== History ==
Naukri.com was launched on 27 March 1997. The company was started as a floorless employment exchange. It was a database of resume, jobs, and recruitment consultants. Conceived as a platform of job seekers and hiring managers to meet, the services went commercial in October 1997.

It all started when Sanjeev Bikhchandani quit his corporate job at Hindustan Milkfood Manufacturers (now Glaxo Smithkline) and founded two companies with his partner - Info Edge (for arranging database) and Indmark (pharmaceutical) . Info Edge offered salary reports to various categories of college graduates such as engineering and MBAs. Salary reports were sold to companies, somewhere between 5000 and 10,000 INR. Sanjeev and his business partner at Info Edge operated from servants’ quarter located in Sanjeev's home.

In 1991, The Department of Telecom (DoT) advertised for videotex services. Info Edge submitted the business plan to DoT and it was shortlisted. For reasons undisclosed, the department canceled the pilot project. This was a setback and Sanjeev and his business partner parted ways. His partner took Indmark and he was left in charge of Info Edge.

During a visit to an IT fair at Delhi's fairground (Pragati Maidan), he was drawn to a stall written WWW Curious, Sanjeev found more about how the Internet worked. The Internet was new in India in the 90s. He took help from his brother Sushil who was residing in the US to hire a server. The server was hired at a monthly rent of $25.

This is how Info Edge India, which was then a holding company of Naukri.com was started. On 1 May 1995, it became Info Edge (India) Private Limited.

In 1996, the recession hit and the company suffered loss. It was then Sanjeev took help from his friend Anil Lall and shared the thought of creating the website. Anil Lall was offered a 7 percent share in the company. Another friend, VN Saroja took care of the operations. She was made 9 percent shareholder in the company.

Naukri.com was launched on 2 April 1997 and the first version of the website had 1000 jobs collected from 29 newspapers. Reviews of business magazines, newspapers and word-of-mouth followed. Jobseekers learned job search on Naukri was free, and soon more people started logging in. Traffic on Naukri.com slowly and steadily increased.

In 2012, the company launched mobile apps for Blackberry, Android and iPhone devices and reportedly received 23% of its traffic from mobile users in 2013.

== Naming issues ==
The website has faced problems with competitors registering websites with names similar to naukri.com. The World Intellectual Property Organization (WIPO) ordered Abs IT Solutions to transfer the domain naukarie.com to Info Edge India.

== Business model ==
The website follows Business-to-Business and Business-to-consumer models.

The website generates revenue through Subscription fees and advertising. 90 percent of the revenue earned is from the recruiters (B-2-B). 10 percent of the income sources are from jobseeker services.

== See also ==
- List of employment websites
