= Matrimony.com =

Indian matchmaking company

Matrimony.com Limited
- Type: Public
- Traded as: NSE: MATRIMONY; BSE: 540704
- Industry: Matchmaking
- Founded: 14 April 1997
- Founder: Murugavel Janakiraman
- Headquarters: Chennai, India
- Brands: BharatMatrimony
- Revenue: ▲₹481 crore (US$50 million) (FY24)
- Net income: ▲₹49 crore (US$5.1 million) (FY24)
- Number of employees: 4,000
- Website: matrimony.com

Matrimony.com Limited is an Indian online matrimonial service company, whose flagship brand is BharatMatrimony. The company has 20 offices in India, with additional offices in the US, Dubai and Bangladesh.

The company runs BharatMatrimony, Assistedmatrimony, and Elite Matrimony., along with websites catering regionally such as BengalMatrimony.com, MarathiMatrimony.com, GujaratiMatrimony.com, PunjabiMatrimony.com, HindiMatrimony.com, SindhiMatrimony.com, KannadaMatrimony.com, KeralaMatrimony.com, TeluguMatrimony.com and TamilMatrimony.com, which were all initiated in 2000.

== History ==
In 2005, BharatMatrimony launched BharatMatrimony Centres, its offline division.

In 2012, the company started Matrimony Directory, a wedding vendors classifieds portal.

In 2006, Bharat Matrimony earned an entry in the Limca Book of World Records for having facilitated the most documented marriages online in India.

In 2013, Consim Info changed name to Matrimony.com

In 2021, Matrimony launched BharatJodii App which is a vernacular matchmaking app for lower income groups and blue-collared workers.

In 2022, Matrimony.com started 'RainbowLuv' to cater to people from the LGBTQIA+ community.

== Services ==
=== Assisted Matrimony ===
The company launched the personal assisted service in 2008 with BM Privilege. This was then renamed Privilege Matrimony in 2009, and later Assisted Matrimony.

=== Elite Matrimony ===
"Elite Matrimony", launched in 2008, caters to wealthy individuals. The website employs staff who assist members in searching for potential partners, and its services are available only to invited members who must pay a matchmaking service fee. The site was founded in 2008 by Murugavel Janakiraman in Chennai.
