= Info Edge =

Indian multinational technology company

Info Edge Limited
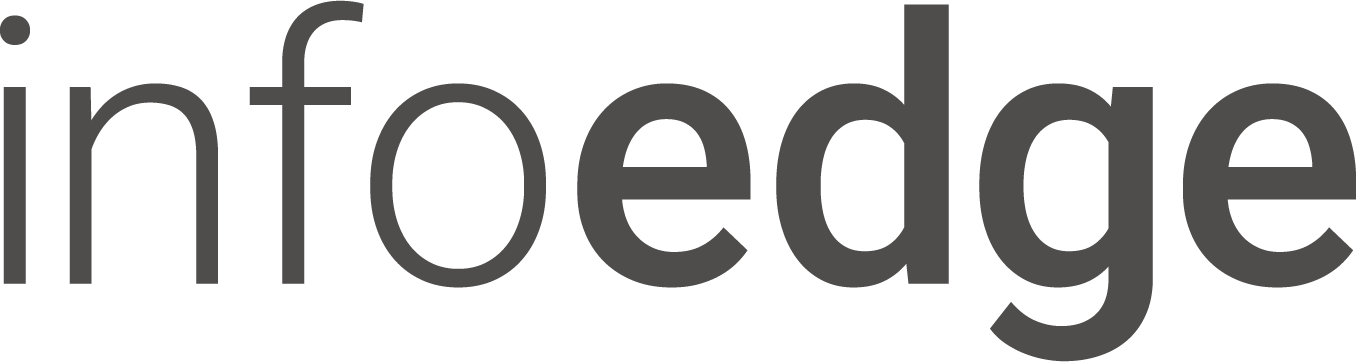
- Type: Public
- Traded as: NSE: NAUKRI; BSE: 532777
- ISIN: INE663F01024
- Industry: Internet; Classifieds
- Founded: 1995; 31 years ago
- Founder: Sanjeev Bikhchandani
- Headquarters: Noida, Uttar Pradesh, India
- Area served: India, United Arab Emirates, Bahrain, Saudi Arabia
- Key people: Hitesh Oberoi (CEO)
- Products: Naukri.com; Jeevansathi.com; 99Acres.com; Shiksha.com
- Services: Employment; Education; Real estate; Matrimonial services
- Revenue: ▲₹2,654 crore (US$280 million) (FY25)
- Operating income: ▲₹1,073 crore (US$110 million) (FY25)
- Net income: ▲₹977 crore (US$100 million) (FY25)
- Number of employees: 4,049 (2022)
- Website: www.infoedge.in

Info Edge is an Indian technology holding company which owns, operates and invests in internet-led businesses. The company's offerings include the flagship employment website Naukri.com, matrimonial website Jeevansathi.com, real estate classifieds platform 99Acres.com, and educational portal Shiksha.com, among others. As of 2018, more than 70 percent of the company's revenue came from Naukri.com.

As of September 2020, it also held minority stakes in 23 online companies including two unicorns—the food delivery company Zomato (15.23% stake, as of July 2021) and the insurance aggregator Policybazaar (13.3% stake, as of November 2021).

== History ==
Info Edge was founded by Sanjeev Bikhchandani in 1995, initially reproducing classified ads from newspapers on its website. In April 1997, Bikhchandani started Naukri.com with help from his brother and friends. It then launched Jeevansathi.com in 1998, 99acres.com in 2005 and Shiksha.com in 2008. Info Edge went public in 2006 under the ticker symbol "Naukri". It launched offshoots of Naukri such as NaukriGulf.com for Gulf countries in 2006 and FirstNaukri.com for campus recruitment in 2009.

Info Edge was one of the early investors of Zomato (then known as FoodieBay) and reportedly invested in Policybazaar in 2008 before its website was launched. Between 2010 and 2013, Info Edge invested a total of ₹86 crore in Zomato across four rounds and became the controlling shareholder in Zomato. Zomato ceased to be a subsidiary of Info Edge in September 2015. In the later years between 2017 and 2018, Info Edge made investments in the education-technology company, NoPaperForms (Meritto), an Education CRM and Enrolment-automation software for educational institutions.

In 2020, the company set up an alternative investment arm called Info Edge Ventures under which it started Info Edge Venture Fund, a venture capital fund to invest in early-stage technology startups. As of 2022, Info Edge Ventures has three investment funds–Info Edge Venture Fund, Info Edge Capital, and Capital 2B.

== Acquisitions ==
Year	Company	Type	Ref.
2017	AmbitionBox	workplace discovery platform	
2019	iimjobs.com hirist.tech	job portals	
2021	Zwayam	HR software	
2021	DoSelect	HR and skilling platform	
2022	Aisle	dating app	
2022	Broker Network	real estate broker platform	
2022	Coding Ninjas	edtech platform	
2019	BigShyft	recruitment	

== Affiliated companies ==
- Zomato
