= Joram Muzira =

Ugandan fashion person (born 1987)

- Born: Joram Muzira Job; 1987 (age 38–39); Jinja District, Uganda
- Other name: Muzira Joram Job
- Education: Yale High School; Aggrey Memorial School
- Alma mater: Makerere University
- Occupations: Fashion entrepreneur Model scout and coach Show director Voice-over artist Television personality
- Years active: 2004–present
- Known for: Founder of Joram Model Management (JMM)
- Notable work: Miss Tourism Uganda; UNAA Causes Fashion Weekend; Abryanz Style and Fashion Awards
- Awards: Star Maker Honorary Award (2019)

Joram Muzira alias Muzira Joram Job (born in 1987) is a Ugandan Fashion entrepreneur, model scout and coach, show director, voice over artist, and a TV personality. He founded JMM (Joram model management Uganda) that signed international models that include Aamito stacie Lagum and Patricia Akello.

== Personal life and education ==
Joram was born in Jinja District to late Dr. Muzira Eriab Ngobi Geseri who died in June 1994 and late Muzira Ndera who died in October 1994.

Joram studied his primary education from Kamuli Boys primary school, Lake Victoria primary school, Mwiri primary school, Bushenyi Town school and St. Francisco primary school in Hoima. For his secondary level education, Joram attended Yale High School and Aggrey Memorial School. Joram graduated in 2009 with a bachelor's degree in urban planning from Makerere University.

== Career and working experience ==
Joram waitered for Design Agenda Limited in his Uganda Advanced Certificate of education vacation in 2004. He worked as a part time administrator and casting manager for Talent Africa.

Joram volunteered for Ugandan designers like Santa Anzo, Stella Atal and Sylvia Owori. He worked both as a model and scout for Ziper modeling Agency and African Woman magazine under the supervision of Sylvia Owori. He scouted models for Sylvia Owori for the 2012 'Forever love' fashion show. A show that Joram produced.

Joram's JMM has managed models who include; Aamito Lagum, Aliet sara, Akello Patricia, Adit Priscilla, Lamich Kirabo, Ayak Veronica, Mayor Dutie, Akech Joy wimnie, Paul Mwesigwa, Angair Biong, Achan Biong, Adut Mary and a number of local models from both Uganda and south Sudan.

Joram produced fashion shows which included the UNAA causes fashion weekend in Washington DC in August 2018 and also in New York in 2019, Abryanz style and fashion awards (ASFA'S) show that was organized by Titus brian Ahumuza since the awards' inception in 2013. He produced other shows that included Seed Project 2018, Miss Tourism Uganda from 2016 to 2018, Kampala Fashion Week, and Italy Fashion Show-Revolution Africa 2019.

Joram scouted and coached models for miss tourism Uganda from 2015 to 2018 fashion show that he produced. He hosted the Kampala fashion week. Joram judged on beauty pageants that include miss Albinism East Africa, little miss Uganda and little miss universe.

== Awards, nominations and recognitions ==
1. His Joram Model Management was nominated under the Best Model Management on the Africa Continent (Africa) category at the Abryanz Style and Fashion Awards 2016.
2. Joram received a Star Maker Honorary Award at the Abryanz Style and Fashion Awards 2019

== See also ==
1. Abryanz Style and Fashion Awards 2016
