= Miss Tourism Uganda =

National beauty pageant

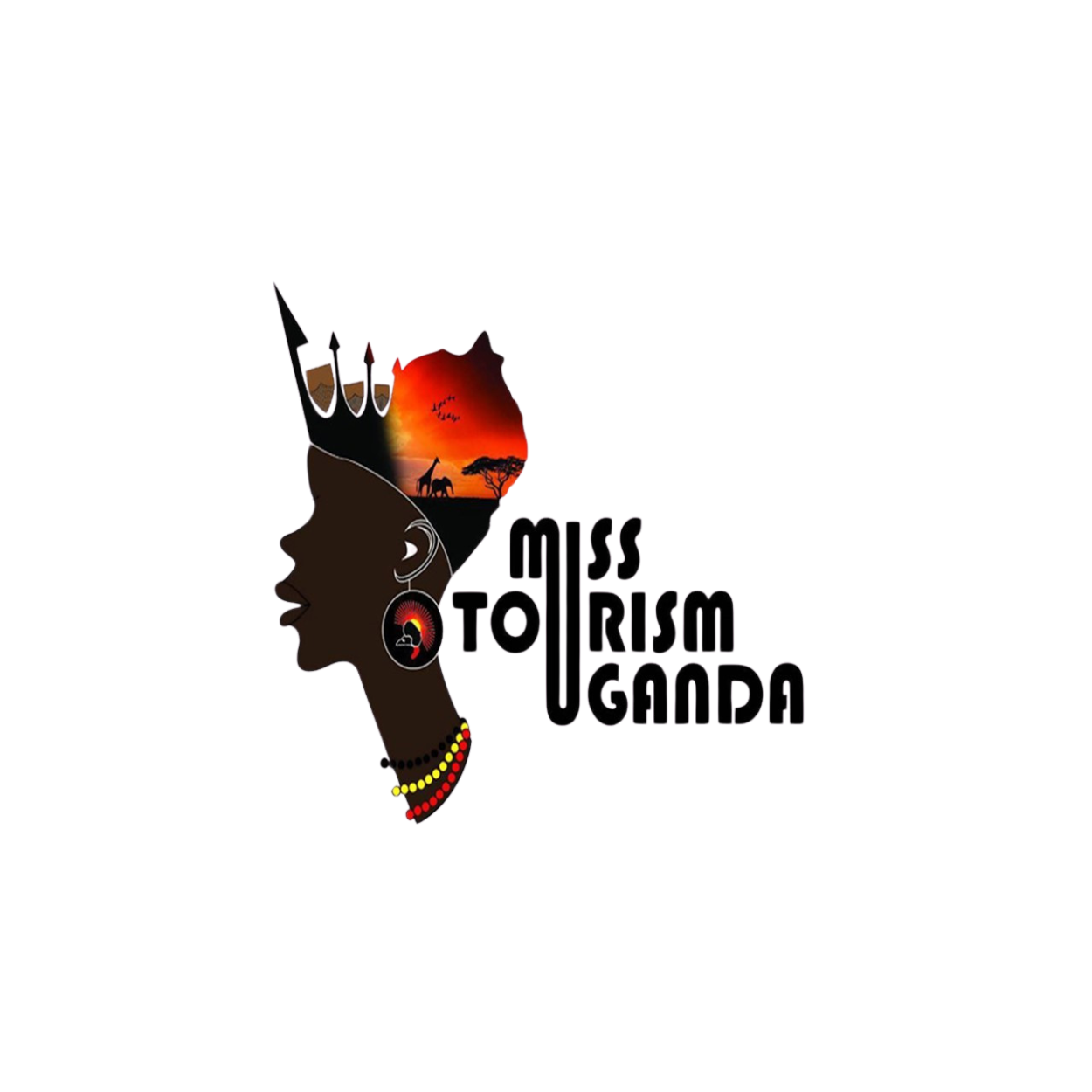
- Headquarters: Kampala, Uganda
- First edition: 2013
- Most recent edition: 2025
- Current titleholder: Nachap Cindy Kezia; Uganda
- Language: English
- Website: Official Website

Miss Tourism Uganda is an annual national beauty pageant and cultural ambassador initiative rooted in promoting tourism, culture, and sustainable development across Uganda.

== History ==
The Miss Tourism Uganda beauty pageant was founded to showcase the country’s natural beauty, diverse heritage, vibrant local cultures, and empower young women through Pageantry, the pageant selects representatives from its 12 regional clusters for a national finale in Kampala.

Miss Tourism Uganda was re-launched in 2013 by the late Uganda Minister of Tourism, Wildlife and Antiquities Maria Mutagamba.

In 2020, Miss Tourism became the first national entity to put a large spotlight on Aruu Falls in Pader.

Miss Tourism also carries out a number of activities that support tourism such as sanitation drives, road safety campaigns, conservation awareness & advocacy as well as introducing new tourism experiences and sites.

== Title Holders ==
Miss Tourism Uganda Title Holders and their reigning years.

Year (Reign)	Titleholder	Country
2025-2026	Nachap Cindy Kezia	Uganda
2024–2025	Atino Lucky Bianca	Uganda
2023–2024	Nabukonde Kiyayi Ruokaya	Uganda
2022–2023	Nabulya Sydney Kavuma	Uganda
2021–2022	Susan Kahunde	Uganda
2020–2021	Sonia Komugisha	Uganda
2019–2020	Kyeru Phiona Bridget	Uganda
2018–2019	Margaret Kankwanzi	Uganda
2017–2018	Challa Elma Kapel	Uganda
2016–2017	Eldad Epiaka Odongkara	Uganda
2015–2016	Pauline Akurut	Uganda
2014–2015	Patricia Babirye Ntale	Uganda
2013–2014	Harriet Barbara Nakitto	Uganda
2012–2013	Aisha Nagudi	Uganda

== See also ==
- Enid Mirembe
- Quiin Abenakyo
- Miss Tourism International
- Hannah Karema Tumukunde
