= Anita Fabiola =

Ugandan actress, businesswoman

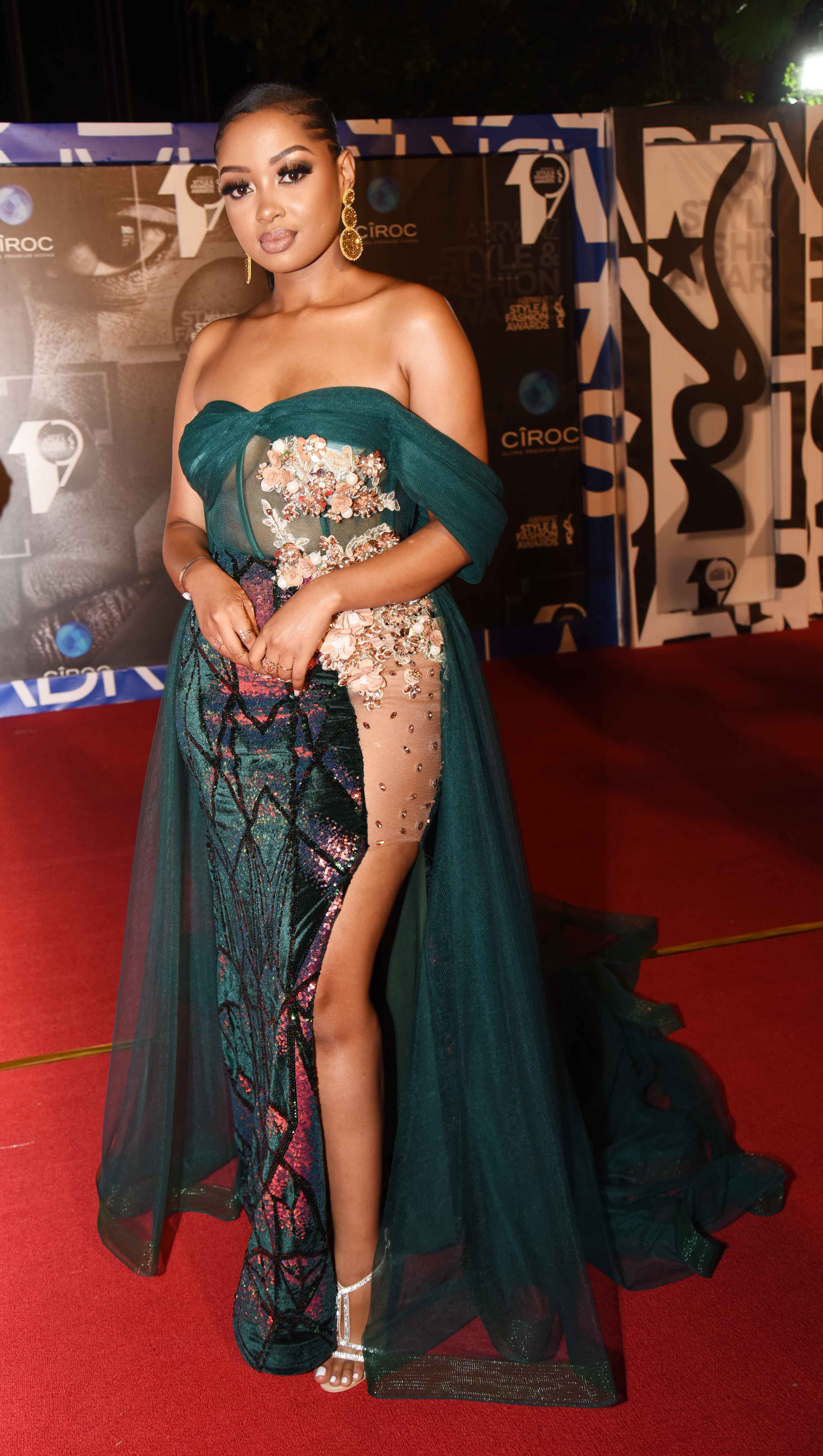
- Fabiola at Abryanz Style and Fashion Awards 2019
- Born: Anita Kyarimpa
- Education: Makerere University
- Spouse: Mark Ronald
- Awards: Miss Uganda West 2013; Miss Uganda 2013 First Runner up; Miss Photogenic 2013
- Presenting career
- Show: NBS Katch Up
- Station: NBS TV Uganda
- Time slot: Every Friday 10 pm to midnight
- Country: Uganda
- Previous shows: Be my date NTV; Second Chance NTV; Studio 256

Anita Kyarimpa better known as Anita Fabiola is a Ugandan actress, tourism ambassador, event host, businesswoman, and former beauty queen. In February 2019 she was appointed as a Goodwill Tourism ambassador headlining the "Tulambule" campaign in liaison with the Uganda Tourism Board to promote tourism all over Uganda. Prior to hosting the Be my date show on NTV in 2014, Fabiola became Miss Uganda West and the first runner-up in the overall Miss Uganda beauty pageant in 2013. She has hosted red carpet events at award ceremonies in several African countries. These include Africa Magic Viewer's Choice Awards in Nigeria (2016), Namibia Annual Music Awards (2016 and 2017), Ghana Movie Awards 2016, Ghana Music Awards 2016, Glitz Awards Ghana 2017, Abryanz Style and Fashion Awards 2016 among others.

== Career ==
At the age of 12 she was a model at the Arapapa modelling agency. In 2008 she modelled for Flair magazine. While in high school, Fabiola participated in the school's beauty pageants which earned her titles like, Miss London College, Miss St. Lawrence schools and colleges. This led her to participate in the nationwide, Miss High School Kadanke in 2012 which she won, making her the first "Miss Kadanke."

In 2013, Fabiola won the Miss Uganda West title and became first runner-up and Miss Photogenic in the overall Miss Uganda pageant.

Fabiola started her television career in 2014 as host of the dating show Be My Date on NTV, which aired on Sundays at 8 pm. The show was voted the most watched in Uganda in 2014/2015. Following the show's success, Fabiola won Best Female TV Personality at the 2015 Buzz Teeniez Awards.

After leaving NTV, she had a short stint as a stand-in presenter at Capital FM.

As an actress, Fabiola is best known for her role as Angella in NTV's remake of the telenovela drama series, Second Chance that was released in October 2016 on the same station. However, due to a very busy schedule, she left the show to pursue other lucrative business interests across the globe. Fabiola also played a supporting role in the 2015 series Studio 256 also on NTV. Her first acting role was in the 2013 Malayalam-language thriller Escape from Uganda, in which she played the murdered daughter of a city mayor.

In February 2018 she began co-hosting the music and entertainment show Katch Up on NBS TV with Douglas Lwanga.

In Uganda she co-hosted the Miss Uganda 2016 pageant and hosted the launch party for Luc Belaire wines on New Year's Eve 2016. She has also hosted the Hip Hop Awards 2016, the Uganda Entertainment Awards 2017 and a concert by Tekno and Mr Eazi.

In May 2018 she attended the Cannes Film Festival and walked its red carpet.

In April 2018 she launched The Fabiola Podcast on the Afripods app. Her first guest was the radio and television presenter Malaika Nnyanzi.

In February 2019, she was unveiled as a Tourism ambassador involved in the "Tulambule", a tourism campaign aimed at promoting local tourism in Uganda. Together with a team of fellow celebrity ambassadors that included Salvador (Patrick Idringi), Gaetano Kaggwa, Marcus Kwikiriza and kickboxer Moses Golola, the team traversed various parts of the country exploring not just the panoramic landscape but also different cultures and traditions while encouraging fellow Ugandans to do the same.

=== Endorsements ===
Fabiola has endorsed several brands. She has been a brand ambassador for CAT Footwear, Paramour Cosmetics, Luc Belaire, Virginia Black, MTN Pulse, Jumia Uganda and Lauma Uganda.

== Achievements and recognition ==
AWARD	YEAR	COUNTRY	DETAILS
Buzz Teeniez Awards	2015	Uganda	Winner-Female TV Personality
Abryanz Style & Fashion Awards	2016	Uganda	Winner-Most stylish TV personality

== Philanthropy ==
Fabiola founded the Fab Girls Foundation, which works to raise community awareness of violence against women and girls. At the start of 2019, she launched a campaign, selling her custom designed calendars in a bid to raise money for her charity.

== Personal life ==
Mark Ronald proposed to Fabiola in the Maldives in August 2021. In December 2022 he and his family visited her parents for okugamba obugyenyi, a private Runyankore ceremony at which the groom's family asks to marry the bride.
