= Joy Lehai Kanyarutokye =

First Ugandan woman to be crowned Miss Uganda with both parents Ugandan

- Born: 1946 (age 79–80); Uganda
- Education: Makerere University (BA)
- Occupation: Beauty queen
- Relatives: Sharon O (granddaughter)
- Beauty pageant titleholder
- Title: Miss Uganda 1968

Joy Lehai Kanyarutokye (born 1946) was the first Ugandan woman to be crowned Miss Uganda with both parents Ugandan on 28 October 1968.

== Personal life and education ==
Lehai was a daughter of Dr Norman Kanyarutokye and she was the first out of five children.

She graduated from Makerere University with a Bachelor of Arts in 1970.

She married Dr. Festo Higiro on 6 June 1970 at All Saints Church in Nakasero but they later divorced. She was the grandmother of Sharon O a former dancer in the Obsessions dance group.

== Career ==
She was crowned the 1968 Miss Uganda on 29 October 1968 at Sheraton Hotel in Kampala when she was 22 years old. She weighed 111 lbs (approximately 50 kg) and her height was 5 feet and 4 inches. On 14 November 1968, Lehai competed in London at the 1968 Miss World beauty content representing Uganda at Lyceum Theatre.

== See also ==
1. Miss Uganda
2. Stella Nantumbwe

Awards and achievements
| Preceded by Rosemary Salmon | Miss Uganda; 1968 | Succeeded by Helen Acheng |
