= Innocent Kawooya =

Ugandan fintech executive, film producer and financial inclusion advocate

- Born: 1988-01-30; Masaka, Uganda, Africa
- Education: Victoria Nursery schools, Molly and Paul Primary school, Sikkam Manipal University, Harvard University, Wharton University of Pennsylvania, University of Cumbria
- Occupations: Computer Programmer & FinTech Financial inclusion specialist
- Organization: HiPipo Foundation
- Known for: FinTech and financial inclusion, Internet entrepreneurship, film production and Music & Awards.
- Notable work: HiPipo Music Awards, Digital Impact Awards Africa, My Doctor, Life of a Champion Film, HiPipo Foundation, 40 Days 40 FinTechs
- Title: CEO, HiPipo
- Website: https://www.innocentkawooya.com/

Innocent Kawooya (born 30 January 1988) is a Ugandan computer programmer, Fintech and financial inclusion specialist, film producer, philanthropist and politician. He is one of the co-founders of the digital transformation and inclusive financial technology company HiPipo and has served as its CEO since 2013.

He serves as co-chair of a benevolent charity organization and the Mojaloop Community Council. Innocent entered politics when he was nominated on September 29, 2020, for the position of lord mayor of Kampala City. Kawooya received the TIG Network Afrika CEO of the Year Accolade 2021–2022 in December 2021.

Through his work in digital innovation, financial inclusion and initiatives such as Include Everyone and 40 Days 40 FinTechs, he has helped advance opportunities for communities across Africa. In recognition of his contribution to Uganda, he received the National Independence Medal from His Excellency the President of Uganda during the country’s 62nd Independence Day celebrations in 2024, becoming the first Ugandan under 40 to receive this national honour.

== Early life and education ==
Kawooya was born in Masaka District, Uganda, in 1988.He is the second born of Anthony Kalule and Florence Namatovu Kalule. He went to Victory Nursery School and Molly & Paul Primary School, before attending St.Henry's College Kitovu and St. Mark Namagoma for secondary school. He attended Sikkim Manipal University - Kampala, studying a Bsc. in information technology. He pursued a master’s degree in Leadership and Sustainability through Robert Kennedy College and the University of Cumbria, and later completed a Professional Leadership Certificate at Harvard University.

== Career ==
In 2005, Innocent, John Mark Ssebunya and friends co-founded HiPipo as a social entertainment platform. He has been involved with HiPipo for most of his career and became its CEO in 2009, supporting digital innovations, with a particular focus on promoting digital financial inclusion. He also worked as a junior lecturer as well as a computing/ICT tutorial assistant at Makerere University College of Humanities and Social Sciences for four years. Between 2009 and 2013, Innocent co-conceptualized and co-developed My doctor app and Afro-Examiner.com. The two applications received international recognition from IndiAfrica, the Orange Africa Challenge and ITU Innovation Excellence.

In the mayoral election for the Kampala City seat for 2021-2026, Innocent was a candidate and received less than 0.3% of the votes. The incumbent, Erias Lukwago, emerged as the winner of the race. In 2020, Innocent was elected to Co-Chair the Mojaloop Community Council, less than a week after he was voted onto the Council.

In 2018, he co-wrote, co-produced (with Wakaliwood, and NG Films) and directed the comedy-drama film 'Life of A Champion'. Starring Ugandan kick boxer Moses Golola. The film is a semi-autobiographical account of his (Golola's) life. After a theatrical release at an event graced by the deputy speaker of the Parliament of Uganda Jacob Oulanyah, Innocent worked towards its release on Amazon Prime, which marks the first instance of a Ugandan film appearing on that particular streaming platform.

== Campaigns and Initiatives ==
=== HiPipo Foundation and the Include Everyone program ===
The "Include Everyone" program was launched by the HiPipo Foundation under the direction of Innocent with the goal of transforming the lives of billions of people around the world by providing them with access to safe digital financial services, allowing them to participate in the global economy and achieving the Sustainable Development Goals aimed at achieving 100% financial inclusion of the global population.

=== Women-in-FinTech Hackathon & Summit ===
In September 2020, there was a Women-in-FinTech Hackathon & Summit. It was meant and still is to serve as a catalyst for women to claim their proper place in the FinTech development ecosystem. 15 women-led teams took part; they received mentoring, Level One Principles instruction, and the chance to turn their concepts into FinTech solutions. As a result, he smuggled the above agenda into Uganda and went on to lead one of the continent's largest Women FinTech programs.

=== 40 Days 40 FinTechs ===
This project began on May 13, 2020, and was hosted on July 15 and 16, 2020, at the Kampala Sheraton Hotel. It was live-streamed on NTV Uganda and Smart 24 TV. The Gates Foundation generously funded the first 40 Days 40 FinTechs program, which was organized in collaboration with Crosslake Tech, ModusBox, and the Mojaloop Foundation and brought together 40 African-based financial technology firms with a focus on women-led FinTechs. The Second Season began in July 2021.

== See also ==
- Erias Lukwago
- Moses Golola
