= Kyeru Phiona Bridget =

Ugandan model (born 1997)

- Born: September 27, 1997 (age 29); Iganga District
- Citizenship: Ugandan, British
- Years active: 2017–present
- Known for: Modelling
- Parents: Balazewa David (father); Nabirye Florence (mother)

Kyeru Phiona Bridget, (born 27 September 1997) is a Ugandan model and beauty pageant title holder. She is a former Miss Tourism Uganda and was crowned to this title on 4, October 2019.

== Early life and career ==
Kyeru was born on 27, September 1997, in Iganga district to Nabirye Florence and the late Balazewa David in a family of four. In the 2019 she participated in miss tourism Busoga only to succeed as the first runner-up. The competition was won by Sandrah Nguna. She further contested for miss tourism Uganda and won in 2019. She represented Uganda at miss tourism international in Malaysia and was later on appointed an ambassador at Arcadia suits.

== Pageantry ==
=== Miss Uganda cooperative college Tororo 2017 ===
Kyeru won the title of Miss Uganda cooperative college Tororo pageant in January 2017 at the age of 20.

=== Miss Tororo 2017 ===
Kyeru won the title of miss Tororo in 2017.

=== Miss pearl eastern Uganda 2018 ===
Kyeru competed for the title of miss pearl eastern Uganda and won.

=== Miss tourism Busoga 2019 ===
Kyeru competed in miss tourism Busoga in 2019 and finished as the 1st runner-up.

=== Miss tourism Uganda 2019 ===
Kyeru was crowned miss tourism Uganda on October 4, 2019, winning on her first attempt at the age of 20. Phiona won other 24 contestants from nine sub-regions across Uganda. She later represented Uganda on the international level.

=== Miss tourism international 2019 ===
On December 12, 2021, Kyeru competed in miss tourism international in Malaysia but didn't win. She was among the top 7 worldwide.

== See also ==
- Enid Mirembe
- Quiin Abenakyo
- Miss Tourism International
- Hannah Karema Tumukunde
