= Zahara Nakiyaga =

Ugandan beauty pageant winner (born 1992)

- Born: 1992 (age 33–34); Uganda
- Citizenship: Ugandan
- Education: Makerere University (Bachelor of Development Studies)
- Occupation: Beauty consultant
- Years active: 2015 — present
- Title: Miss Uganda 2015

Zahara Nakiyaga, also Zahra Nakiyaga is a beauty pageant contestant who was crowned Miss Uganda 2015 at the age of 23 years. She represented Uganda in Miss World 2015 in Sanya, China, in December 2015.

== Early life and education Background ==
Nakiyaga was born to Hajjati Mariam Nabwire, a housewife, and Hajji Muhammed Kiyaga, a businessman, in Wakiso District, in the Buganda Region of Uganda, circa 1992. After attending local primary and secondary schools, she was admitted to Makerere University, Uganda's oldest and largest public university. At the time of her crowning as Miss Uganda 2015, she was in her final year of undergraduate studies at the university. Later in 2015, she graduated from the School of Liberal and Performing Arts at Makerere University, with a Bachelor of Development Studies degree.

== 2015 Miss Uganda pageant ==
As Miss Uganda, Nakiyaga represented her country in the Miss World pageant held in Sanya, China, in December 2015.

== See also ==
- Dora Mwima
- Leah Kalanguka
- Miss Uganda
