= Abbas Kaijuka =

Ugandan fashion designer

- Born: 15 December 1989 (age 36); Uganda
- Occupation: Fashion designer
- Years active: 2016–present
- Awards: Fashion Designer of the Year, Abryanz Style and Fashion Awards 2016

Abbas Kaijuka is a Ugandan fashion designer, stylist and fashion collector known for his brand Kai's Divo.

== Awards and recognition ==
Kaijuka is a recipient of the East Africa’s Male Fashion Designer of the Year award at the 2020 East Africa Fashion Awards and the Fashion Designer of the Year award at the 2016 Abryanz Style and Fashion Awards (ASFAs) and received various nominations, including the East African Designer of the Year award at the 2017 Swahili Fashion Week.

== Awards and nominations ==
Awards & Nominations
| Year | Award | Category | Result | Ref |
|---|---|---|---|---|
| 2021 | African Fashion Designer Awards | Best Fashion Brand in Africa | Won | |
| 2020 | East Africa Fashion Awards | East Africa’s Male Fashion Designer of the Year | Won | |
| 2020 | East Africa Fashion Awards | Stylist of the Year | Nominated | |
| 2019 | Abryanz Style & Fashion Awards | Fashion Designer of the Year | Won | |
| 2019 | The Man Awards Nigeria | Fashion Designer of the Year Africa | Won | |
| 2018 | Abryanz Style & Fashion Awards | Fashion Stylist of the Year | Nominated | |
| 2018 | Pearl of Africa Fashion Awards | Fashion Stylist of the Year | Nominated | |
| 2018 | The Man Awards, Nigeria | Designer of the Year Africa | Nominated | |
| 2018 | Swahili Fashion Week | East African Designer of the year | Nominated | |
| 2017 | Abryanz Style & Fashion Awards | Fashion Stylist of the Year | Nominated | |
| 2017 | Pearl of Africa Fashion Awards | Fashion Stylist of the Year | Nominated | |
| 2017 | Swahili Fashion Week | East African Designer of the year | Nominated | |
| 2016 | Abryanz Style & Fashion Awards | Fashion Stylist of the Year | Won | |
| 2016 | Rising Star Awards | Celebrity Stylist of the Year | Won | |

== See also ==
- Abryanz
- Stella Atal
- Fatumah Asha
- Sylivia Owori
- Anita Beryl
- Santa Anzo
