= Maria Mutagamba =

Ugandan politician and economist

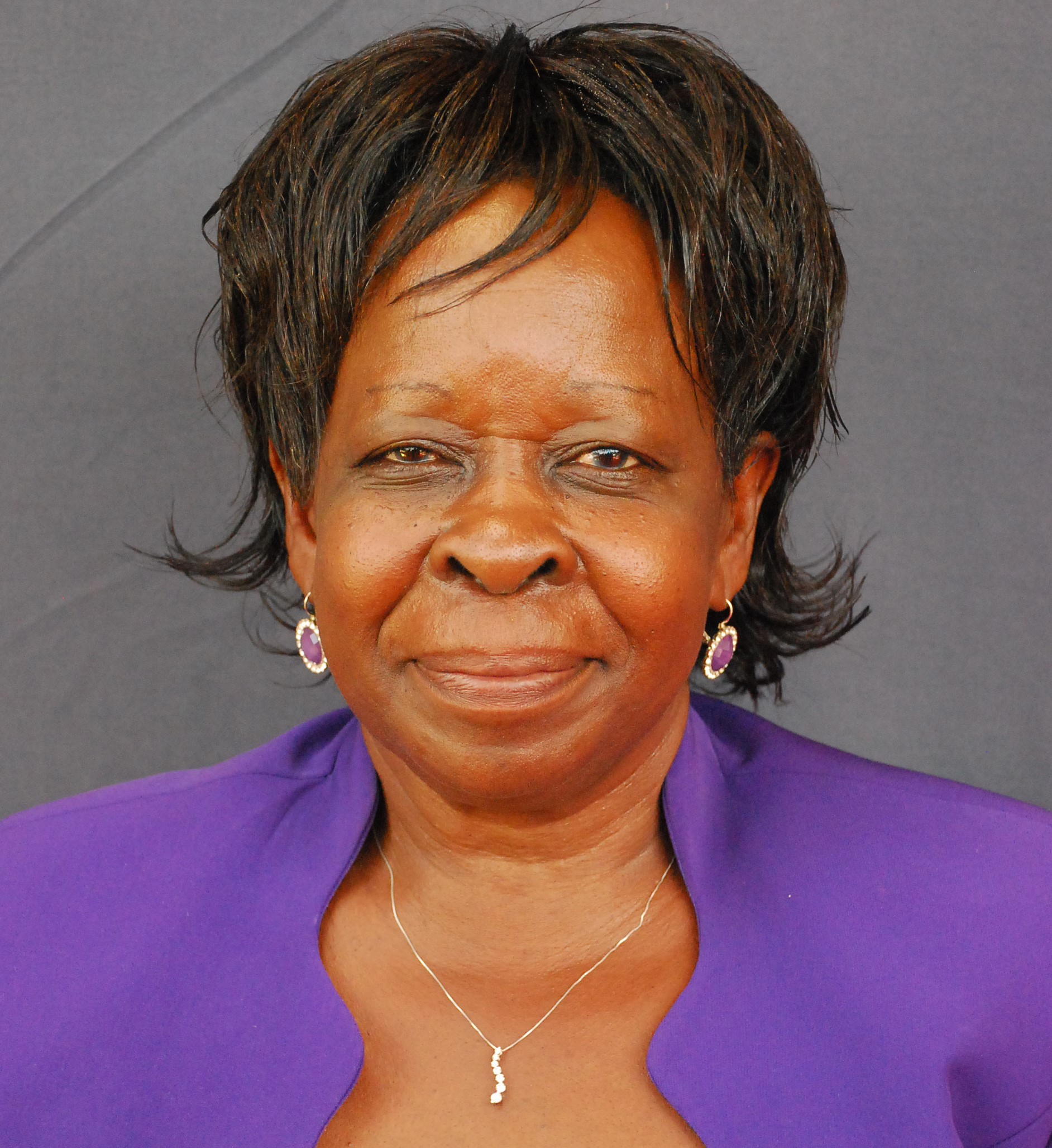
- Mutagamba in April 2016

Minister of Tourism, Wildlife and Antiquities
- In office 15 August 2012 – 6 June 2016
- President: Yoweri Museveni
- Preceded by: Ephraim Kamuntu
- Succeeded by: Tom Butime

Member of Parliament for Rakai District
- In office 2001 – 6 June 2016

Personal details
- Born: 5 September 1952 Uganda
- Died: 24 June 2017 (aged 64) Kampala, Uganda
- Cause of death: Complications from liver cancer
- Spouse: Tarsis Matthew Mutagamba
- Education: Makerere University (Bachelor of Arts in economics); ICL Computer School (Diploma in computer programming); John F. Kennedy School of Government (Certificate in executive leadership); McMaster University (Honorary Doctorate)
- Occupation: Economist & politician

Maria Emily Lubega Mutagamba (5 September 1952 – 24 June 2017) was a Ugandan economist and politician. She was the minister of tourism, wildlife and antiquities in the Ugandan Cabinet from 15 August 2012 until 6 June 2016.

From 2011 to 2012, she was the minister of water and environment. She also served as the elected member of Parliament for Rakai District Women's Representative from 2001 until 2016.

== Background and education ==
Mutagamba was born in Rakai District on 5 September 1952. She studied at St. Aloysius Senior Secondary School in Bwanda, Kalungu District for her O-Level studies (1967–1970). She then attended Mount Saint Mary's College Namagunga in Mukono District for her A-Level education (1971–1972). She attended Makerere University from 1973 until 1976, graduating with a Bachelor of Arts in economics. She also held a Diploma in computer programming from the ICL Computer School in Nairobi, Kenya, obtained in 1980, and a certificate in executive leadership from the John F. Kennedy School of Government in Cambridge, Massachusetts, United States, obtained in 1997. In 2013, she was presented with an honorary doctorate in law by McMaster University in Canada.

== Career ==
Mutagamba served as a banking officer with the Bank of Uganda from 1976 to 1980 and was a director of the bank from 1991 until 1999. She was a Constituent Assembly delegate between 1994 and 1995. In 1999–2000, she was the deputy secretary general of the Democratic Party of Uganda. In 2000, she was appointed minister of state for water resources and later in 2006 was appointed minister of water and the environment, a position she held until 2012. She was the President of the African Ministers' Council on Water from 2004 to 2012 and coordinator of the Global Women Leaders Forum for Water and Sanitation from 2005 to 2012. She also was vice chairperson of the United Nations Task Force on Integrated Water Resource Management. She was known for her works for the cause of water-related issues and the Global Water Harvesting Network.

Mutagamba served as minister of tourism, wildlife and antiquities from 15 August 2012 until being replaced on 6 June 2016 by Ephraim Kamuntu. While she was minister, she was known for promoting a popular Ugandan egg, vegetable, and chapati wrap known as Rolex. She also revived the Miss Tourism Uganda beauty pageant that had started in 2010. She quit active politics in 2016 because of her deteriorating health.

== Personal ==
She was married to Tarsis Matthew Mutagamba who worked for the Bank of Uganda for 17 years until his retirement in 1980. He was the first African chief accountant at the bank. Tarsis died from heart failure on 2 January 2004 at the age of 70. He was survived by 16 children.

== Death ==
Mutagamba died on 24 June 2017 at Case Medical Centre in Kampala from complications of liver cancer, although she also suffered from gallstones. She was 64. She was admitted to hospital three weeks before her death. Prime Minister Ruhakana Rugunda called her death "a great loss to the country". She was buried on 28 June 2017 at Gamba village, Kakuuto Subcounty in Rakai District. The burial was officiated by John Baptist Kaggwa, the bishop of the Roman Catholic Diocese of Masaka.
