= Fatumah Asha =

Ugandan fashion designer

- Born: Fatumah Asha; Uganda
- Education: Makerere University
- Occupation: Fashion designer
- Years active: 2009–present
- Employer: Fatumahasha
- Organization: Tesi Fashion School
- Known for: Bridal wear and bespoke gowns
- Title: Founder and creative director

Fatumah Asha is a Ugandan fashion designer known for her bespoke, elegant creations, especially bridal wear and gowns. She is the founder of the Fatumahasha brand and the proprietor of the Tesi Fashion School, where she also mentors aspiring designers.

== Awards and recognition ==
Fatumah Asha has received several significant awards and recognition for her contributions to the fashion industry in Uganda and East Africa which include;

- Designer of the Year (Uganda): Awarded at the prestigious Abryanz Style and Fashion Awards (ASFAs) in 2018.
- Best Designer: Received this honor at the Uganda Entertainment Awards in 2017.
- Designer of the Year: Won at the Pearl of Africa Fashion Awards in 2018.

Beyond specific awards, her work has been showcased on international catwalks in countries such as Nigeria, Ghana, Kenya, and the United States, gaining recognition across the African diaspora. Her designs are frequently worn by celebrities and public figures on red carpets and at major events in Kampala, solidifying her status as a top designer in the region.

== Education ==
In 2009, she initially enrolled at a university to study human resource management to meet her parents' expectations for a "white collar job".

Driven by her strong passion for design, she later switched courses and successfully earned a Bachelor's degree in Industrial Fine Art, with a specialization in fashion and design, from Makerere University. This career change meant she had to pay her own tuition fees, which she managed by working various gigs, including a stint with Britannia.

== Career ==
Asha started her business, the Fatumahasha brand, professionally in 2009, initially working from her university hall. The initial challenges were significant, but she built her brand through networking and leveraging social media. She specialized in custom-made bridalwear and elegant gowns, which quickly became popular in Kampala's fashion scene and a fixture at weddings and red-carpet events.

After establishing her own successful brand, she founded the Tesi Fashion School in 2019 to provide short courses and mentorship in fashion and design to aspiring local designers.

== Personal life ==
She is married to Juma Ssempijja also known as Juma Shain since 20 August 2022 and she is a mother to a daughter named Asha.

Asha lives with vitiligo, a skin condition causing patches of skin to lose color. She uses her public platform to raise awareness about the condition, educate others, and actively combat the cultural stigma and misconceptions often associated with it in various African communities. She has shared her personal journey extensively, becoming a role model for self-acceptance and resilience.

== See also ==
- Slyvia owori
- Abryanz
- Santa anzo
- Anita Beryl
- Stella Atal
- Abbas Kaijuka
- Women in fashion
