= Anita Beryl =

Ugandan fashion designer (born 1986)

- Born: 11 January 1986 (age 40); Bushenyi, Uganda
- Citizenship: Ugandan
- Education: Bweranyangi Girls' Senior Secondary School; Uganda Christian University (B.A.); Uber Glam, in Johannesburg, South Africa; French Fashion University, ESMOD
- Occupation: Fashion designer
- Years active: 2011–present
- Known for: Fashion
- Title: Founder and creative director of Beryl Qouture

Anita Beryl (born 11 January 1986) is a Ugandan fashion designer, couturier and entrepreneur. She is the creative director of Beryl Qouture, a Ugandan fashion house. The Ugandan magazine Satisfashion Uganda named Beryl one of "The 40 Movers and Shakers of 2016", in December 2016.

== Early life and education ==
Anita Beryl was born to Rev. and Mrs. Ahabwe of Bushenyi district, and is the first-born of six children born to the couple. She attended Bweranyangyi Girls for O- and A-level and left in 2005. She later joined Uganda Christian University, Mukono, for a Bachelor of Arts in Education, graduating in 2009. She attained her first fashion training at Uber Glam, in Johannesburg, South Africa, before joining French Fashion University, ESMOD.

== Career ==
In 2011, she founded Beryl Quoture By Anita Beryl, as an Haute Qouture and ready to wear clothing and accessory franchise for all genders Her label was invited to participate in local, regional and international fashion shows including "Accra Fashion Week", in Ghana and "Swahili Fashion Week" in Tanzania, in 2016 alone. In 2017, she was invited to showcase her design at the World Fashion Week 2017, in Kuala Lumpur, Malaysia. Her expanding client base includes clients in Uganda, Kenya, Tanzania, South Africa, the United Kingdom and other countries. She has also showcased her design at fashion shows in Nigeria, Addis Ababa, Barcelona and Mombasa.

=== Fashion Showcases ===
Year	Fashion Showcase	Location
2019	East African Wedding Show	Kigali, Rwanda
2018	Swahili Fashion Week	Dar es Salam, Tanzania
2018	Abryanz Style and Fashion Awards 2018	Kampala, Uganda
	Africa Fashion Week	Barcelona, Spain
	Abryanz Fashionpreneur Summit	Kampala, Uganda
	Malengo Hot Pink Catwalk	Kampala, Uganda
2017	World Fashion Week	Kuala Lumpur, Malaysia
2016	Paple Rayne Fashion Show	Kampala, Uganda

== Awards and recognition ==
Year	Recognition
2018	Award Recipient, for Outstanding Fashion Designer Chamber of Young Entrepreneurs
2018	Award recipient, Fashion category for the Young Achievers Awards
2017	Feature on CNN's African Voices
	Award of the Fashion Designer of the Year at the Pearl of Africa Fashion Awards
2016	Award of Outstanding Fashion Designer of the year, at Uganda Entertainment Awards
2016	Award of Fashion Designer of the Year (Uganda) for the Abryanz Style & Fashion Awards

== See also ==
- Abryanz
- Fatumah Asha
- Santa Anzo
- Slyvia Owori
- Stella Atal
- Abbas Kaijuka
