= Uganda International Fashion Week =

Ugandan fashion industry event

- Status: Active
- Genre: Fashion exhibition, Trade fair, Cultural event
- Date: Annually (varying dates)
- Frequency: Annual
- Venue: Various (including Kampala Serena Hotel)
- Location: Kampala
- Country: Uganda
- Years active: 2003–present
- Inaugurated: 2003
- Founder: Santa Anzo
- Organizer: Arapapa Fashion House

Uganda International Fashion Week (UIFW) is an annual fashion week and trade exhibition held in Kampala, Uganda. Established in 2003 by fashion designer and entrepreneur Santa Anzo, it is the longest-running fashion platform in the country. The event is designed to promote "The Business Behind Fashion," focusing on the fashion value chain, job creation, and the professionalization of the African creative economy.

== History ==
=== Foundation and early years ===
UIFW was launched in 2003 by Santa Anzo through her fashion house, Arapapa, at a time when the Ugandan fashion industry was largely informal and lacked structured platforms for professional growth. The inaugural event aimed to provide a structured platform for local designers to showcase their work to international buyers and media, bridging the gap between Ugandan creativity and global fashion markets.

=== Hiatus and revival ===
After a period of inactivity in the late 2000s, the event made a significant return in August 2019 at the Kampala Serena Hotel. This edition was held in collaboration with South Africa's Department of Arts and Culture and featured a "cross-cultural" theme, bringing together designers from both Uganda and South Africa to foster regional trade and artistic exchange.

=== Recent developments ===
In 2026, it was announced that UIFW would partner with the World Fashion Exhibition (WFE) to host the "World Fashion Week Africa Preview," positioning Kampala as a burgeoning fashion hub for the continent and strengthening Uganda's presence in the global fashion calendar.

== Objectives and impact ==
The primary mission of UIFW is to transition fashion from a leisure activity to a sustainable economic sector. Its core objectives include:

- Socio-economic change: Using fashion as a tool for youth and women's employment through skills development and entrepreneurship opportunities.
- Fashion tourism: Partnering with the Uganda Tourism Board to promote Uganda as a destination for cultural and creative tourism, attracting international visitors and media coverage.
- Value addition: Encouraging the use of local materials such as Barkcloth (a UNESCO Intangible Cultural Heritage) and Kitenge to support the domestic textile industry and preserve traditional craftsmanship.
- Trade and export: Facilitating business-to-business networking between African designers and international buyers, retailers, and fashion houses.

== Notable participants ==
The event has featured a diverse range of prominent African designers, models, and industry figures, including:

- Santa Anzo (Uganda) – Founder and creative director
- Stella Atal (Uganda) – Fashion designer and entrepreneur
- Fatumah Asha (Uganda) – Textile artist and designer
- Abbas Kaijuka (Uganda) – Fashion designer
- Judith Heard (Uganda) – Model and fashion advocate
- Various designers from South Africa, Kenya, Tanzania, and Nigeria have also participated in recent editions.

== See also ==
- List of fashion events
- Culture of Uganda
- African fashion
- Swahili fashion
