= Agnes Akiror =

Ugandan politician

- Born: 28 July 1968 (age 58); Kumi District, Uganda
- Citizenship: Uganda
- Education: Ngora High School (Uganda Certificate of Education); Mende Kalema Memorial Senior Secondary School (Uganda Advanced Certificate of Education); International Institute of Business and Media Studies (Diploma in Accounting); Uganda Martyrs University (Bachelor of Arts in Democracy & Development Studies); Negev College in Israel (Certificate in Sustainable Human Development)
- Occupations: Accountant and politician
- Years active: 1988–present
- Known for: Politics
- Title: State Minister for Teso Affairs

Agnes Akiror Egunyu (born 28 July 1968), known as Agnes Akiror, is a Ugandan politician. She is the current State Minister for Teso Affairs in the Cabinet of Uganda. She was appointed to that position on 6 June 2016. Prior to that, from 27 May 2011 until 6 June 2016, she served as Minister of State for Tourism. She replaced Serapio Rukundo, who was dropped from the cabinet. In the cabinet reshuffle of 1 March 2015, she retained her cabinet post. On account of being a cabinet minister, she is an ex-officio Member of Parliament.

== Background and education ==
Akiror was born in Kumi District on 28 July 1968. After attending a local primary school, she enrolled in Ngora High School in Ngora, graduating in 1984. For her A-Level education, she attended Mende Kalema Memorial Senior Secondary School, in Wakiso District, graduating from there in 1988. She attended the International Institute of Business and Media Studies, graduating in 2000, with the Diploma in Accounting. She attended Uganda Martyrs University from 2006 until 2010, graduating with the degree of Bachelor of Arts in Democracy & Development Studies. She also holds the Certificate in Sustainable Human Development, obtained from Negev College in Israel in 2008.

== Career ==
From 1988 until 1989, she served as an accounting assistant at Oya Rural Development Association. From 2000 until 2005, she served as the Managing Director of Eyalama, a local non-governmental organization. She served as the Member of Parliament representing the women of Kumi District on the Forum for Democratic Change political party ticket. However, in 2010, she left the FDC and lost her parliamentary seat. On 6 June 2016, she was named State Minister for Teso Affairs.

== Other considerations ==
Agnes Akiror is single. She is of the Roman Catholic faith.

== See also ==
- Cabinet of Uganda
- Parliament of Uganda
- Government of Uganda
- Kumi
- List of members of the tenth Parliament of Uganda
