= Afripods =

Kenyan podcasting platform

Afripods is a Kenyan podcasting platform that focuses on the African market. It was founded in 2017 by Molly Jensen and had become one of Africa's largest podcasting platforms by 2022. It describes itself as a "full-service podcasting platform" and both hosts and distributes podcasts for creators.

== History ==
Afripods was founded in Nairobi, Kenya by Molly Jensen in 2017. Jensen claimed in the Daily Nation that she wanted to develop a platform where African history could be recorded by Africans, saying that she "felt embarrassed as an African that I relied on western media." Inspired by the success of African radio networks, she founded Afripods to replicate that on a smaller scale. In 2021, Afripods partnered with Nation Media Group to host the company's podcasts.

A 2022 report by Baraza Media Lab found that Afripods was one of the most used podcasting platforms in Africa and the most used homegrown platform. In 2023, Afripods began converting traditional radio station's shows into podcast form, describing the new model as being "on-demand radio."

As of 2023, Afripods hosts podcasts in 50 languages and from 30 countries across Africa.

== Business model ==
Afripods describes podcasting as a "low-cost way to preserve African culture, traditions, and language." To that end, the company offers a full-service podcasting platform, offering hosting and distribution services for podcasts along with promotion for creators. The company also operates an advertising network for podcasts. Podcasts hosted by Afripods are available on Afripods own platform, along with platforms like Spotify, Stitcher, and Apple Podcasts.

Afripods was the first podcasting platform to pay creators directly in Africa, without the need for them to create an American or European bank account.

== Podcasts ==
- "The Fabiola Podcast," hosted by Anita Fabiola
- "Legally Clueless," hosted by Adelle Onyango
