= Umar Semata =

Ugandan kickboxer

- Born: 20 May 1992 (age 34); Uganda
- Other names: The Pain
- Height: 1.70 m (5 ft 7 in)
- Weight: 71 kg (156.5 lb; 11.2 st)
- Division: Welterweight; Middleweight; Super Middleweight
- Style: Muay Thai
- Fighting out of: Phuket, Thailand
- Team: Muay Thai Plaza (2010–2012); Lion Muay Thai (2012–2013); Tiger Muay Thai (2014–present)
- Trainer: Satawut Intapun; Yodkunsup Por Pongsawang
- Years active: 2006–present

Umar Semata (born 20 May 1992) is a Ugandan middleweight and super middleweight Muay Thai fighter and the former WBC World Boxing Council Muay Thai Interim Super Middleweight Champion.

== Biography ==
=== Early career ===
After winning numerous events in boxing, he was spotted by Shala Golola who immediately recognized his talents and convinced him to swap to Muay Thai. Semata was selected at the age of 18 to represent the Ugandan national Muay Thai team to compete in Thailand.

=== Muay Thai ===
On 20 July 2012, in an event organized by the World Professional Muaythai Federation, Semata lost by point to Saenchai in Ratchaburi Province, Thailand.

==== East African Muay Thai International Champion ====
On 14 June 2013, Semata faced Australian fighter Rhys Karakyriacos and won on points the World Boxing Council Muay Thai Interim Super Middleweight Champion. The fight took place in Semata's hometown of Kampala, Uganda.

=== Lethwei ===
In 2017, Semata agreed to terms with the World Lethwei Championship and on 4 November, Semata made his Lethwei debut against veteran Soe Lin Oo at WLC 3: Legendary Champions in Yangon, Myanmar inside the Thuwunna National Indoor Stadium. Semata lost by knockout in the second round.

== Muay Thai record (incomplete) ==
Professional Kickboxing Record
41 Wins (16 (T)KO's), 15 Losses, 2 Draw
Date	Result	Opponent	Event	Location	Method	Round	Time
2024	Win	(Uganda) Moses Golola			KO		
2024-04-27	Loss	(Thailand) Detrit Sathian Gym	Kunlun Fight 97, Qualifying Tournament Final	Beijing, China	Decision (Unanimous)	3	3:00
2020	Win	(Thailand) Song Chai	EM Lgend Fight	China	TKO		
2019	Loss	(Uganda) Moses Golola			KO	3	
2018	Win	(Uganda) Moses Golola	NTV		Points	5	3:00
2018	Win	(Russia) Artur Sushinskhiy			Decision		
2017-12-02	Loss	(Thailand) Yodwicha Por.Boonsit	EM Legend 26	Leshan, China	TKO	3	
2016-06-05	Loss	(Thailand) Kem Sitsongpeenong	Emei Legend 9	China	Decision	3	3:00
2016-04-02	Win	(China) Wang Pengfei	EM Lgend 7	Xichang, China	Decision	3	3:00
2014-12-10	Win	(Thailand) Khankhan Wongtrakol	Kunlun Fight 6 World title Super Welterweight	Hong Kong, China	Decision	3	3:00
2014-05-03	Win	(Egypt) Abdallah Hussein	WKF AFRICA Champion in Super Welterweight	Kampala, Uganda	Decision	5	3:00
2014-02-19	Loss	(Thailand) Imwiset Pornarai	Yokkao 7	Pattaya, Thailand	Decision	3	3:00
2014-01-25	Loss	(Belarus) Andrei Kulebin	Kunlun Fight 1. Semi Finals	Pattaya, Thailand	Decision	3	3:00
2013-06-14	Win	(Australia) Rhys Karakyriacos	WBC Muay thai International Super Middleweight Champion	Kampala, Uganda	Decision	5	3:00
2012-11-29	Loss	(Thailand) Superbon Lookjaomaesaivaree	Muay Thai Warriors	Thailand	Decision	5	3:00
2012-07-20	Loss	(Thailand) Saenchai PKSaenchaimuaythaigym	WPMF Super Welterweight title Muaythai Gala – TV 11	Ratchaburi Province, Thailand	Decision	5	3:00
2011-11-02	Loss	(Thailand) Jomhod Kiatadisak	Bangla Stadium	Phuket, Thailand, Thailand	Decision	5	3:00
Legend: Win Loss Draw/No contest Notes

== Lethwei record ==
Professional Lethwei record
0 wins (0 (T)KOs), 1 losses, 0 draws
Date	Result	Opponent	Event	Location	Method	Round	Time
2017-04-11	Loss	(Myanmar) Soe Lin Oo	WLC 3: Legendary Champions	Yangon, Myanmar	KO (Right Cross)	2	
Legend: Win Loss Draw/No contest Notes

== Kun Khmer record ==
Professional Kun Khmer record
0 wins (0 (T)KOs), 1 losses, 0 draws
Date	Result	Opponent	Event	Location	Method	Round	Time
2026-05-16	Win	(Iran) Slamak Ilbeigi	Dragon Kun Khmer	Kampot, Cambodia	TKO	2	1:29
2025-07-03	Loss	(Cambodia) Thoeun Theara	Ganzberg Golden Boy Kun Khmer	Phnom Penh, Cambodia	Decision	3	3:00
Legend: Win Loss Draw/No contest Notes

Sporting positions
Preceded by Rhys Karakyriacos	World Boxing Council Muay Thai Interim Super Middleweight Champion; 14 June 2013 –	Succeeded by N/A
