= Leah Kalanguka =

Ugandan model

- Born: Leah Kalanguka; 1991 (age 34–35); Iganga, Uganda
- Height: 1.75 m (5 ft 9 in)
- Beauty pageant titleholder
- Title: Miss Uganda 2014
- Hair color: Black
- Eye color: Black
- Major competitions: Miss Uganda 2014 (Winner); Miss World 2014 (Unplaced)

Leah Kalanguka (born 1991) is a Ugandan actress, model and beauty pageant titleholder who was crowned Miss Uganda 2014 and represented her country at the Miss World 2014 pageant.

== Background and education ==
Leah was born in Busembatya, in Iganga District, circa 1991, into a family of six siblings; all female. Her father, Kayondo Kalanguka is employed at the Ministry of Finance, Planning and Economic Development (Uganda), and her mother Jane Bagaya Kalanguka, teaches agriculture at Makerere College School.

She attended Nakasero Primary School before joining Trinity College Nabbingo for her primary and secondary education, respectively. In 2012, she entered Makerere University to study Computer Engineering, graduating in 2015.

== Pageantry ==
=== Miss Uganda 2014 ===
On Sunday 26 October 2014, Leah Kalanguka, representing Iganga District, was crowned as Miss Uganda 2014, at a ceremony held at Speke Resort, in Munyonyo, beating off 19 other contestants. Although she represented a district from Eastern Uganda, she missed the eastern regional search. She was away in Tooro, helping to teach youths how to grow cabbages, something her mother, who also hails from the sub-region, had taught her. She was able to enter the contest through the open selection held in Kampala, which was open to all single girls who had never given birth and who were between the ages of 18 and 24.

=== Miss World 2014 ===
Leah represented Uganda in Miss World 2014 pageant held in London, United Kingdom, in December 2014.

== Other roles ==
In 2015 Leah made a guest appearance in Sipi the Movie, directed by Jayant Maru, and featuring Stephen Kiprotich and Ugandan actor Patriq Nkakalukanyi.

In 2016, she participated as a contestant in the World Next Top Model 2016. At that contest, she was voted Miss People's Choice out of a total of forty four contestants. She had the highest number of votes on the contest's online voting platform.

== See also ==
- Tourism in Uganda
- Agriculture in Uganda

Awards and achievements
Preceded by Stellah Nantumbwe	Miss Uganda; 2014	Succeeded by Zahra Nakiyaga
