= Serapio Rukundo =

Ugandan politician

- Born: 6 April 1952 (age 74); Uganda
- Citizenship: Uganda
- Education: Makerere University (Bachelor of Commerce)
- Occupations: Accountant & Politician
- Years active: 1976 – present
- Known for: Politics

Serapio Rukundo is a Ugandan accountant and politician. He was the State Minister for Tourism and Wildlife in the Ugandan Cabinet, from 1 June 2006 until 27 May 2011. In the cabinet reshuffle of 27 May 2011, he was dropped from the cabinet and replaced by Agnes Akiror. He also served as the elected Member of Parliament representing Kabale Municipality from 2001 until 2011. During the 2011 national election cycle, he lost the Kabale Municipality parliamentary seat to Andrew Baryayanga.

== Background and education ==
He was born in Kabale District on 6 April 1952. He studied at Ntare School. Serapio Rukundo holds the degree of Bachelor of Commerce, majoring in Accounting, obtained from Makerere University, Uganda's oldest university.

== Career ==
From 1976 until 1978, he worked as an accountant at Mvule Saw Mill, a private lumber factory. He then served as Senior Accountant at Woods Industries Corporation Limited, another private company, from 1978 until 1980. In 1980 he moved to the Uganda Development Bank, serving as the Accounts Manager until 1989. In 1989, he was appointed Chief Accountant at National Housing and Construction Corporation, serving in that capacity for twelve years until 2001. In 2001, at the age of 49, he entered politics, contesting for the parliamentary seat of Kabale Municipality. He won and was re-elected in 2006. However, in 2011, he lost his parliamentary seat on 18 March, and was dropped from the cabinet on 27 May.

== Controversy ==
During his five-year tenure as State Minister for Tourism, he came under criticism on two counts:

1. While appearing before the Public Accounts Committee of the Parliament of Uganda in December 2009, he denied recommending the inclusion of an unfinished hotel on the list of establishments earmarked to host delegates for the Commonwealth Heads of Government Meeting 2007 which took place in Kampala, Uganda's capital. J&M Hotel received government funds amounting to USh2.7 billion (approx.1.2 million in 2007 money), only two days to the opening day of CHOGM 2007, hosted no conference event and no delegate slept there because it was still under construction, according to the report issued by the government's Auditor General.
2. In July 2011, the former State Minister for Tourism stated that he did not know much about the Protected Areas Management and Sustainable Use (PAMSU) project under the tourism ministry. "Rukundo also admitted that he supported a proposal for an additional US$43 million, to ostensibly complete unfinished activities without getting a report on how the previous US$38 million was spent". "Rukundo admitted that the PAMSU project had flaws and that there was no value for money". All this took place during the proceedings of the Commission of Inquiry into alleged mismanagement of Uganda Wildlife Authority funds. The chairman of the commission, retired Justice George Kanyeihamba described the former minister as incompetent.

== Personal affairs ==
Serapio Rukundo is married. He is reported to enjoy music. He belongs to the National Resistance Movement political party.

== See also ==
- Cabinet of Uganda
- Parliament of Uganda
- Kabale District
