= Rosemary Salmon =

Ugandan beauty queen

Rosemary Salmon was the first and youngest woman to be crowned Miss Uganda on 5 November 1967. and also the first Ugandan to participate in an International beauty pageant. She was a Ugandan of British descent.

== Background and education ==
She was a student at Makerere University. She is the grand mother of Sharon Angella Nalukenge Salmon alias Sharon O.

== Career ==
Rosemary was crowned Miss Uganda on 5 November 1967 at Apollo Hotel which is now known as Sheraton Kampala Hotel by the 1966 Miss World, Reina Faria who was from India.She was among the six African entrants at the 1967 Miss World beauty pageant at the Lyceum Ballroom in London, a competition that was won by Madeleine Hartog of Peru on 16 November 1967 The six African contents came from Gambia, Ghana, Kenya, Nigeria, Tanzania and Uganda.

== See also ==
1. Stellah Nantumbwe
2. Miss Uganda 1967
3. Madeleine Hartog-Bel

Awards and achievements
Preceded by none	Miss Uganda; 1967	Succeeded by Joy Lehai Kanyarutoke on 28 October 1968
