= Second Chance (Ugandan TV series) =

Ugandan telenovela

- Poster
- Genre: Telenovela
- Created by: Phad Mutumba
- Based on: El Cuerpo del Deseo
- Written by: Phad Mutumba
- Starring: Stellah Nantumbwe; Roger Mugisha; Fagil Mandy; Laura Kahunde; Housen Mushema; Scola Scot; Douglas Dubois Sebamala; Anita Fabiola; Sarah Kisawuzi
- Country of origin: Uganda
- Original language: English

Production
- Running time: 40-45 minutes

Original release
- Network: NTV Uganda
- Release: October 31, 2016 – 2018

Related
- En cuerpo ajeno (1992); El cuerpo del deseo (2005)

Second Chance, commonly known as 'NTV Second Chance' or 'Second Chance Uganda' is a Ugandan telenovela produced by NTV Uganda. The story is a remake of the Spanish-language telenovela El Cuerpo del Deseo, produced by Telemundo which aired on NTV Uganda in 2009 and attracted a large audience in Uganda.

NTV Uganda acquired the rights to produce a Ugandan version which features former UNEB Chairman Fagil Mandy as Peter Byekwaso, former Miss Uganda Stellah Nantumbwe as Isabel Byekwaso, media personality Laura Kahunde as Angela, Roger Mugisha as Saava Ssebina, and Housen Mushema as Andrew Masa.

This limited-run series is about a man who comes back from the dead and discovers dark secrets about his beautiful widow. It premiered on 31 October 2016 on NTV Uganda and a premiere event at Serena Hotel, Kampala.

== Plot ==
The story features Peter Byekwaso (Fagil Mandy), a wealthy old man who lives in a big mansion with his daughter Angela and his servants. He falls in love with and marries a gorgeous younger woman, Isabel (Stellah Nantumbwe). He dies suddenly, and Isabel marries employee Andrew. But Peter returns to Earth through transmigration (the passing of a soul into another body after death), inhabiting the body of Saava (Roger Mugisha), a handsome but poor family man.

== Cast ==
Casting for the Second Chance started early 2015 and Fagil Mandy and Stellah Nantumbwe were the first to be cast in the lead roles as Peter Byekwatso and Isabela Arroyo respectively. The role of Angela, which Anita Fabiola played in the first half of the show was given to Laura Kahunde. NTV advertised for casting calls and more than three thousand Ugandan actors applied for different roles. Most roles were however given to well known actors for easy promotion of the show.

- Stellah Nantumbwe as Isabel, the notorious but sexy young wife of Peter. In the original opera, Isabela is played by Mexican telenovela actress Lorena Rojas
- Roger Mugisha as Saava, an equivalent of Salvador played by Mario Cimarro
- Fagil Mandy as Peter Byekwaso
- Anita Fabiola as Angela
- Housen Mushema as Andrew
- Laura Kahunde as Angela, replacing Anita Fabiola

== Awards and nominations ==
Awards and nominations
| Year | Award | Category | Received by | Result | Ref |
|---|---|---|---|---|---|
| 2017 | Uganda Entertainment Awards | Best TV Series | | Nominated | |
| 2017 | Uganda Film Festival Awards | Best TV Drama | Phad Mutumba | Nominated | |
| 2017 | Uganda Film Festival Awards | Best Actor in a TV Drama | Fagil Mandy | Nominated | |
