= Stella Atal =

Ugandan painter and fashion designer

- Born: c. 1983 (age 42–43); Uganda
- Education: Bachelor of Fine Arts; Master of Fine Arts
- Occupation: Fashion Designer
- Years active: 2007 - present
- Known for: Fashion design
- Title: Founder, Owner & President of Atal Stella Fashion House, Paris, France

Stella Atal (born c. 1983), is a Ugandan painter and fashion designer, who is the founder, owner and chief executive of Atal Stella Fashion House, with locations in Paris, France.

== Background and education ==
She was born in the Northern Region of Uganda, along the northern shores of Lake Kyoga. Stella started her schooling in Kampala, Uganda's capital and largest city. She relocated to Kenya and continued her education there. Later, she completed her education in the United Kingdom. She has a bachelors and a master's degree in Fine Art.

== Career ==
In 2007, she started her own label, Atal Stella. There she focuses on using what is locally available, including eco-friendly, natural and re-cycled material. Her designs have showcased at the Africa Fashion Week New York, in 2010 and at the Green Fashion Switzerland, in 2011. Stella's work has been featured in two issues of the prestigious Italian Vogue magazine.

In March 2009, Stella Atal showcased a handful of her now famous simple African designs of linen and organic cotton with bold handmade prints and sea shell cotton at the launch of the Fashion Corporate Nite at Efendya's, Centenary Park and made an impression so big that the rest of the designers faded in the background.

In 2016, she relocated from Kampala, Uganda to Paris, France. The following year, she received a license that allows manufacturing and selling of her branded clothes and copyrighted art pieces in France and the rest of the European Union. She tours internationally in Continental Europe, United Kingdom and the United States.

== Awards and honors ==
Stella Atal won the African Designer of The Year award by the Ethical Fashion Awards, held in London in 2008. In 2010, she won the Afric Collection Fashion Award in Douala, Cameroon.

== Other considerations ==
She lectures to art students and fashion designer students. She also works with refugees and disadvantaged youth, particularly girls. In addition, she works with HIV/AIDS patients both in Kampala and in the Northern Region of the county.

== See also ==
- Sylvia Owori
- Santa Anzo
- Anita Beryl
- Fatumah Asha
- Abryanz
- Abbas Kaijuka
