= Abryanz =

Ugandan fashion designer

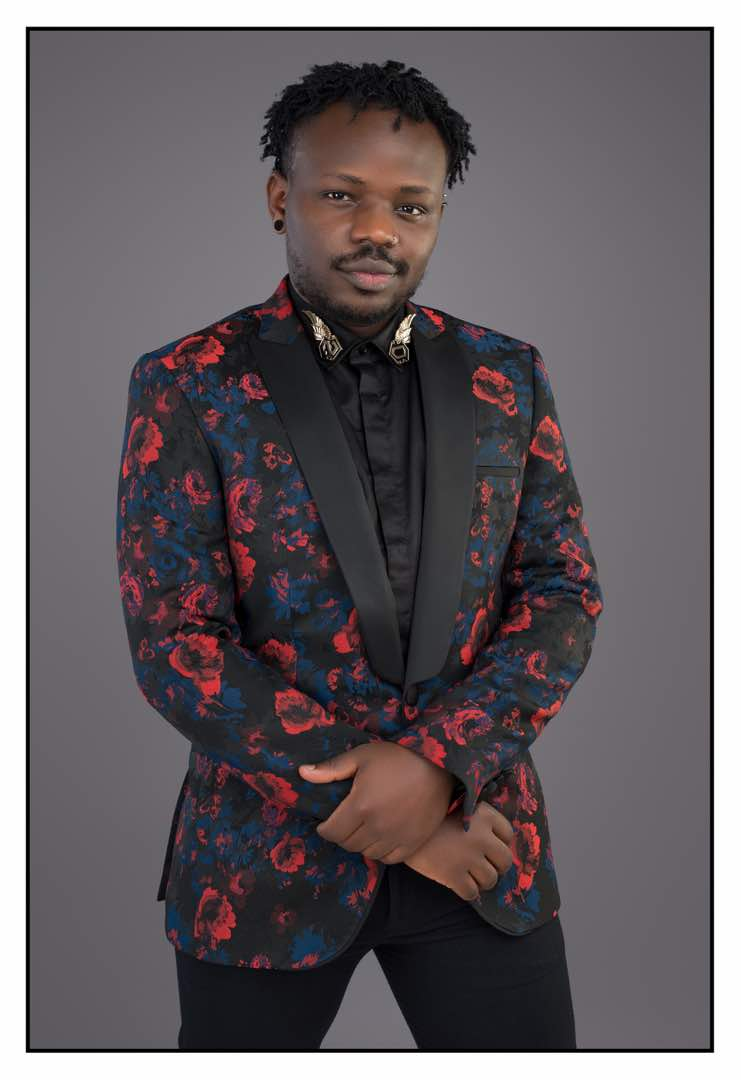
- Abryanz in 2018
- Born: Titus Brian Ahumuza; 1 November 1990 (age 35); Nsambya Hospital
- Other name: Abryanz
- Citizenship: Ugandan
- Education: Kyambogo University
- Occupation: Fashion designer
- Years active: 2012–present
- Known for: Fashion design

Titus Brian Ahumuza (born 1 November 1990), commonly known as Abryanz, is a Ugandan fashion designer. He is a celebrated fashion entrepreneur and the founder of the Abryanz Style & Fashion Awards (ASFAs) in Uganda.

== Early life and education ==
Abryanz was born in Masindi on 1 November 1990. He attended Asaba Primary School and Bugema Adventist Secondary School, and later graduated with a Bachelor's degree in Social Work & Social Administration from Kyambogo University.

== Career ==
He began working at an early age during his senior six vacation as a cleaner and errands boy earning UGX 120,000 at Huawei Technologies.

In 2009, he launched his own label, Abryanz Collection. His designs have been showcased in Uganda, Nigeria, South Africa, and at Africa Fashion Week. He has also featured in various issues of prestigious Vogue magazines.

In 2013, he introduced the Abryanz Style and Fashion Awards (ASFAs), a continental fashion awards in Uganda aimed at recognizing outstanding achievements in the African fashion industry.

== Recognition ==
On 3 December 2025, Cîroc Vodka officially unveiled celebrated fashion entrepreneur and Abryanz Style & Fashion Awards (ASFAs) founder, Brian Ahumuza, popularly known as Abryanz, as its brand ambassador. The announcement was made during a media event hosted by the ASFAs team, which also shared updates on the 2025 awards program, entertainment lineup, and audience expectations leading up to the ceremony.

In 2017, Abryanz was awarded as the Best Fashion Designer in Starqt Awards in South Africa, following his recognition as the CEPA Young Entrepreneur in 2016. That same year (2016), he was featured as one of Africa's rising stars on CNN's African Voices.

== See also ==
- Sylvia Owori
- Anita Beryl
- Fatumah Asha
- Santa Anzo
- Stella Atal
- Abbas Kaijuka
