= Digital Impact Awards Africa =

2014 campaign by the government of India

- Maximizing the Digital Dividend
- Awarded for: Digital inclusion, financial inclusion and Cybersecurity
- Location: Kampala
- Country: Uganda
- Presented by: HiPipo
- First award: 2014
- Website: www.digital-impact-awards.com

Digital Impact Awards Africa (DIAA) is a platform that promotes digital inclusion, financial inclusion, and cybersecurity under the theme Maximizing the Digital Dividend. The awards seek to recognize and appreciate different organizations leading the use of digital media in this respect.

Digital Impact Awards Africa is organized by HiPipo.

== Eligibility ==
To be considered, nominees must have substantially contributed to digital space in Africa. Entries should offer innovative, useful or engaging digital (web, mobile, social media) content, applications, services or utilities including digital financial services with good cybersecurity practices. Nominees may include companies (corporate/SMEs), nonprofit organizations, digital applications, projects, platforms, and promotions. Media houses are not eligible. The project covers 3 main domains: Digital Inclusion, Financial Inclusion and Cybersecurity. The International Telecommunication Union (ITU), the United Nations' specialized agency for Information and Communication Technologies (ICTs), listed Digital Impact Awards Africa among the ICT projects and events that celebrated ITU's 150th Anniversary ITU Listing.

== Jury and Research Panel voting ==
Submission for nomination is evaluated and decided by the Research Panel. Final awards winners are decided by the Jury Panel and Public Vote. The Jury and Research Panel are composed of individuals with extensive knowledge and experience in ICT roles such as entrepreneurs, innovators, academics, consultants, policy makers, and thought-leaders.

== Award winners ==
The winners of the 2nd Digital Impact Awards Africa were:

Category	Winner
Best Payments/Transfers Service	Payway
Best Online/Mobile Banking Service	Standard Chartered Bank (Uganda)
Best Mobile Money Service	MTN Mobile Money
Best Government Agency on Social Media	National Water and Sewerage Corporation (NWSC, Uganda)
Best Corporate Brand on Socal Media	MTN Uganda
Most Promising Social Media Presence	Crown Beverages Limited (Pepsi, Mirinda, Mountain Dew)
Best E-Commerce (Classifieds / Marketplace)	Cheki
Best E-Commerce (Store/Service)	HelloFood
Best E-Service	Umeme
Best Mobile App	Kaymu
Best Mobile App for Africa	Vodacom My App (South Africa)
Best Digital Marketing Campaign	Airtel Trace Music Star
Best Digital Customer Service	National Water and Sewerage Corporation (NWSC, Uganda)
Commended New Website	PostBank Uganda
Best Corporate Website	Standard Chartered Bank (Uganda)
Best Cybersecurity Practice	Standard Chartered Bank (Uganda)
Best Digital Inclusion Impact	Airtel Uganda
Commended Financial Inclusion Impact	Centenary Bank Uganda
Digital Brand of the Year	MTN Uganda

== Award Winners 2016 Africa ==
Medal of Honor Africa's Financial Inclusion Medal of Honor

1. Mr. Michael Joseph
2. Dr. Nick Hughes
3. Ms. Susie Lonie

Africa's Digital Inclusion Medal of Honor: Mr. Ren Zhengfei AWARD of Excellence

1. Digital Brand of the year – MTN
2. Best Digital Bank for Africa - Standard Chartered Bank
3. Best Mobile Financial Service for Africa - Safaricom/Vodafone M-Pesa
4. Best Mobile Financial Service Platform for Africa - Mahindra Comviva Mobiquity
5. Best Digital Remittances Service for Africa – Money Gram
6. Best Digital Payments Service For Africa – Payway
7. Best Cybersecurity Practice by Bank in Africa - First National Bank
8. Best Smartphone Brand for Africa – Huawei
9. Best Mobile App Innovation for Africa - My Vodacom App
10. Best E-Commerce Service for Africa – Jumia
11. Best Connectivity Initiative for Africa - Google Project Link (Wi-Fi with Roke Telecom)
12. Best Pay TV Service for Africa – DSTV
13. Best Digital Marketing Campaign for Africa - Coke Studio Africa

COMMENDATIONS

1. Transformative Mobile Banking Platform for Africa - RedCloud One Platform
2. Interoperable Digital Payment Enablement for Africa – InterSwitch

== Award Winners 2016 Uganda ==
AWARD of Excellence

1. Best Brand on Social Media - Centenary Bank
2. Best Corporate Website - Stanbic Bank – Uganda
3. Best Cybersecurity Practice by Corporate - Standard Chartered Bank
4. Best Digital Customer Service – NWSC
5. Best E-Service - Umeme (E-Pay Yaka and Mobile App)
6. Best Financial Inclusion Initiative - Airtel Weza
7. Best Government Agency on Social Media – KCCA
8. Best Mobile App - MyMTN App
9. Best Mobile Banking - Centenary Bank
10. Best Mobile Financial Service - MTN Mobile Money
11. Best Online Banking - Standard Chartered Bank
12. Most Promising Social Media Embrace - Stanbic Bank

Certificate of Commendation;

1. Use of Digital for Travel - Modern Coast Express
2. Use of Digital for Engineering & Manufacturing - Movit Products Limited
3. Use of Digital for Foods & Beverage - Hariss International (Riham, Rockboom)
4. Use of Digital for Energy - Total Uganda Limited
5. Use of Digital for Agriculture & Agro Processing - Jesa Farm Dairy Limited
6. Use of Digital for Insurance – UAP
7. Use of Digital for Healthcare - Vine Pharmaceuticals Ltd
8. Use of Digital for Real Estate & Construction - National Housing and Construction Company
9. Use of Digital for Retail & Distribution - Footsteps Furniture
10. Use of Digital for Hospitality - Kampala Serena Hotel
11. Use of Digital for Technology - Yo Dime
12. Use of Digital for Education – UTAMU
13. Use of Digital for Tourism - Great Lakes Safari Limited
14. Use of Digital for Finance and Credit - Mercantile Credit Bank
15. Cybersecurity Practice by Government Institution – Bank of Uganda
16. Championing Digital in Creative Arts Industry – Mr. Moses Ssali

== See also ==
- Africa Digital Awards
