= Dora Mwima =

Ugandan beauty pageant contestant

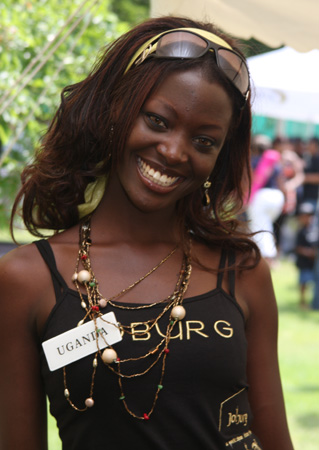
- Born: 1990 (age 35–36); Tororo, Uganda
- Citizenship: Ugandan
- Occupations: Maternal Health Advocate, BusinessWoman
- Years active: 2008 — present
- Known for: Beauty, philanthropy, community work
- Title: Miss Uganda 2008
- Spouse: Nader Barrak

Dora Mwima, also Dorah Mwima, is a Ugandan model and beauty pageant titleholder who was crowned Miss Uganda 2008 at the age of 18. She represented Uganda in Miss World 2008 in South Africa.

== Background ==
Mwima was born to Ugandan parents in 1990, in the Eastern Ugandan town of Tororo. Her father, a preacher, and the family migrated to neighboring Kenya when Dorah was about four years old. The family returned to Uganda in 2008, two weeks before the call for contestants in the Miss Uganda beauty competition went out. She applied and was accepted as a contestant.

== 2008 Miss Uganda pageant ==
As Miss Uganda, Mwima represented her country in the Miss World pageant held in South Africa, in December 2008.

During her reign, she started the Dorah Mwima Foundation, a non-profit charitable organization. The NGO's primary objective is to provide a platform for single mothers and teenage girls "to share experiences on the challenges in life". Through her foundation, she organizes soccer matches, where the gate collections are used to assist pregnant rural mothers in need. During the last three months of her reign it came to light that Mwima had become pregnant.

== After 2008 ==
She decided to keep the baby, making her a teenage unwed mother, because the relationship with the baby's father did not work out. She found work at Darling Hair Collection Uganda, as executive secretary and director of brand. When Mwima's baby was a few months old, a new general manager was posted to Uganda as Mwima's boss. In her role as executive secretary, one of her roles was to take care of corporate guests. The new boss was Nader Barrak, a native of Lebanon, in the Middle East. He and Mwima developed a friendship which blossomed into a romantic relationship.

In 2013, Mwima resigned her job at the company, to eliminate the conflicts of interest. In December 2013, Mwima and Barrak were married in a civil ceremony, followed by a church ceremony on 25 May 2014. Their wedding made the cover of "Bride & Groom", a bridal fashion magazine distributed in the countries of the East African Community.

In June 2015, Mwima gave birth to Gabriella Barrak (Girl). In March 2017, Mwima gave birth to twins, Giovanna Barrak (girl) and Serafin Barrak (boy), the second and third children together.

In February 2019, according to The Observer (Uganda), Mwima revealed that the late Moses Ssekibogo was the natural father of her first born, Ethan Barrak. In October 2021, Dorah gave birth to Sibella Barrak(girl), and in November 2023 her last born Enso Barrak (boy) was born.

== Residence ==
In 2014, Mwima and her husband relocated from Kampala, Uganda to Bujumbura, in Burundi, where Nader Barrak was the Country Manager of "Darling Hair Manufacturers Burundi". In 2016 they relocated back to Uganda. In 2021, during the COVID-19 lockdown, Dorah Mwima launched Queen Ma, a company that produces natural and organic teas and essential oils for mothers and newborns.

In 2023, Mwima opened the WOW MOM Center, offering childbirth classes and doula services. The center expanded into the WOW MOM Wellness and Birth Center in April 2025.

== See also ==
- Miss Uganda
- Enid Mirembe
- Patricia Akello
