= Tom Butime =

Ugandan politician

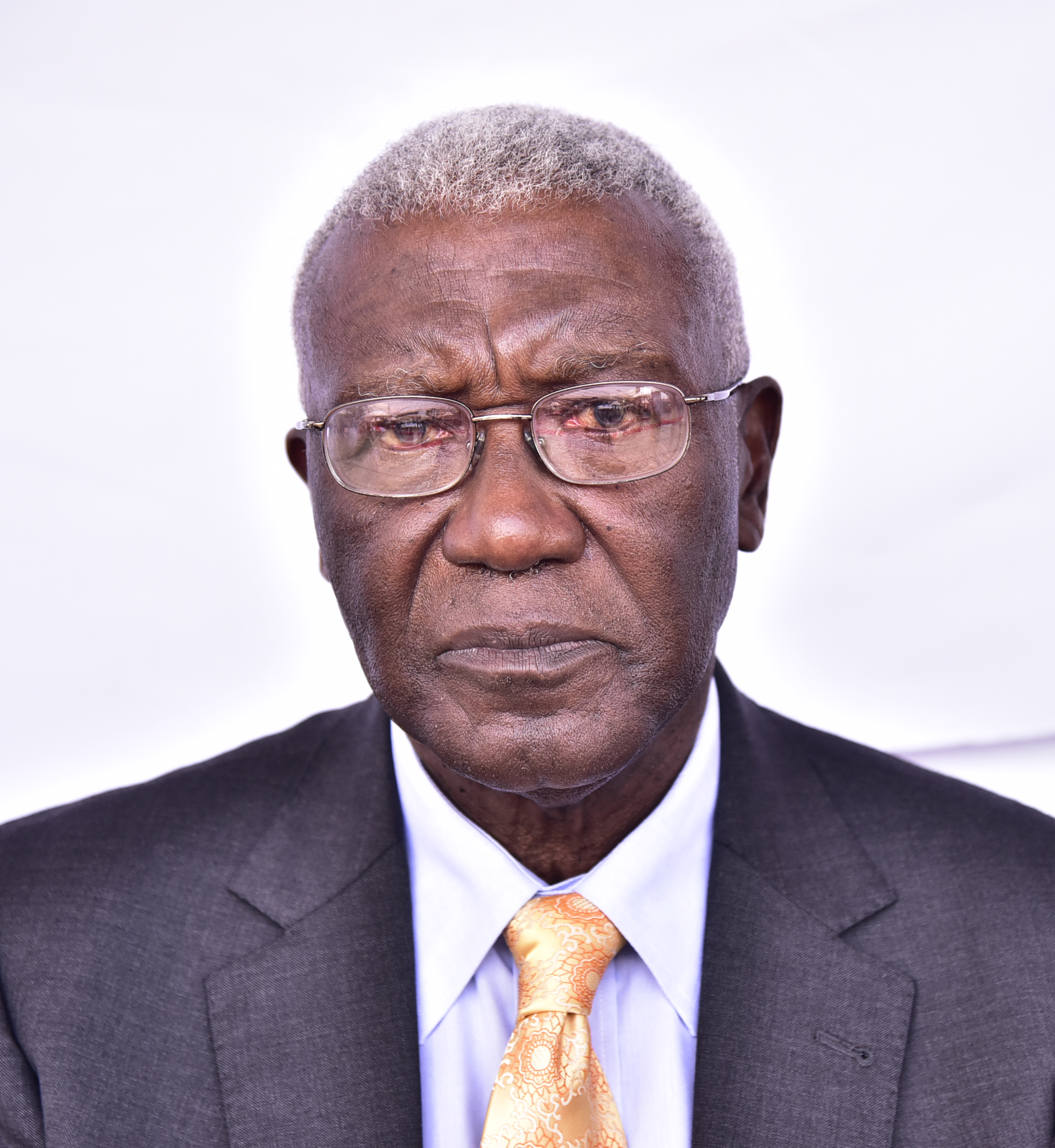

Minister of Tourism, Wildlife and Antiquities
- Incumbent
- Assumed office 6 June 2016
- President: Yoweri Museveni
- Preceded by: Prof. Kamuntu

Personal details
- Born: 1947 (age 78–79) Kyenjojo District, Uganda
- Citizenship: Uganda
- Spouse: Beatrice Butime
- Occupation: politician
- Known for: Politics

Tom Butime (born 1947) is a Ugandan politician. He is the Minister of Tourism, Wildlife and Antiquities in the Ugandan Cabinet. He was the elected representative for Mwenge County Central, Kyenjojo District, in the 10th and 11th Ugandan Parliaments (2016–2026). Museveni appointed him as Minister of Tourism, Wildlife and Antiquities in for the 2026–2031 term.

He served as State Minister for Communications from 13 January 2005 until February 2006. After the general elections in February 2006, he was named State Minister for Karamoja Affairs, a portfolio he declined. In 2011, Butime contested the position of Representative of Mwenge County North, but lost to David Muhumuza.

Previously, Butime was the Minister of Internal Affairs from July 6, 1996, to July 2001, and also served as Minister of State for Refugees and Disaster Preparedness during that time. From 2001 until a cabinet reshuffle in January 2005, Butime served as Minister of State for International Cooperation and from March 2004 to January 2006 as acting Foreign Minister.

== Outside politics ==
He enjoys farming.

== See also ==
- Cabinet of Uganda
- Parliament of Uganda
