= Hannah Karema Tumukunde =

Ugandan model and philanthropist (born 2003)

- Born: Hannah Karema Tumukunde; 1 January 2003 (age 23); Nakaseke District, Uganda
- Education: Makerere University
- Occupations: Model; Beauty Pageant Titleholder
- Beauty pageant titleholder
- Title: Miss Uganda 2023
- Major competitions: Miss Uganda 2023 (Winner); Miss World 2023 (Top 8)

Hannah Karema Tumukunde (born 1 January 2003) is a Ugandan philanthropist, model, and beauty pageant titleholder who was crowned Miss Uganda 2023. She represented Uganda at the Miss World 2023 pageant that took place in India from February 18 to March 9, 2024, where she finished as a Top 8 finalist, and the runner-up and Beauty with a Purpose Winner of the African continent.

== Early life and education ==
Hannah Karema Tumukunde was born on 1 January 2003 at the Nakaseke District in the Central Region of Uganda. She went on to study at the Seroma Christian High School and the Hana International School before entering the Makerere University. She currently lives in Kisasi, Kampala and is a StarTimes brand ambassador in Uganda.

== Pageantry ==
=== Miss Uganda 2023 ===
Karema entered the Miss Uganda 2023 pageant held at the UMA Multipurpose Hall in Kampala, where she competed alongside 20 other contestants for the national title. At the conclusion of the event, Karema was ultimately crowned Miss Uganda 2023 and was awarded a Toyota Wish and a direct pass to represent Uganda at the Miss World pageant.

=== Miss World 2023 ===
Karema represented Uganda at the Miss World 2023 pageant where she emerged as the Beauty with a Purpose Winner of the African continent. In the coronation night, Karema ultimately finished as a Top 8 finalist and was the runner-up to the Miss World Africa title, which was won by Lesego Chombo of Botswana. Her placement was the highest for Uganda in the Miss World pageant since Quiin Abenakyo's Top 5 finish in 2018.

== Advocacy ==
Hannah Karema Tumukunde is the CEO and founder of The Hannah Karema Foundation. During her reign as Miss Uganda 2023, Hannah Karema Tumukunde focused her advocacy on addressing social challenges affecting young girls, particularly early and forced marriages. In interviews following her coronation, she expressed her intention to use her platform to campaign against forced early marriages and promote the protection of girls' rights in Uganda.

At the international level, Karema also presented a Beauty With a Purpose project at the Miss World 2023 competition, which focused on keeping girls in school and equipping children with menstrual hygiene management skills.

== Leadership ==
In March 2026, Hannah declared her bid for Guild President at Makerere University one of the most competitive student leadership races in the country. She later in April 2026 conceded defeat in Makerere University guild race after Gracious Kadondi was elected the 92nd Guild President.
