= Quiin Abenakyo =

Ugandan model (born 1996)

- Born: 11 February 1996 (age 30); Kampala, Uganda
- Education: Makerere University Business School (Bachelor of Science in Business Computing); Korea Advanced Institute of Science and Technology (Master of Science in Information and Communication Technology
- Height: 1.75 m (5 ft 9 in)
- Beauty pageant titleholder
- Title: Miss Uganda 2018, Miss Africa 2018
- Hair color: Black
- Eye color: Dark Brown
- Major competitions: Miss Uganda 2018; (Winner); Miss World 2018; (Top 5)

Quiin Abenakyo (born 11 February 1996) is a Ugandan model and beauty pageant titleholder who was crowned Miss Uganda 2018. She represented Uganda at Miss World 2018 in China and was crowned Miss World Africa 2018. At the Miss World 2018 contest, Abenakyo was a winner in the head to head challenge portion of the contest, and she placed in the Top 5 overall. She is the first Ugandan to place this high in this annual pageant.

== Background and education ==
Abenakyo was born in Mayuge District, in February 1996, to Ugandan parents, Charles Sembera, a Musoga, from Mayuge District and Alice Kyamulesire, a Mutooro, from Kabarole District. She attended St. Joseph’s Girls Nsambya for high school and then graduated with a degree in business computing, from Makerere University Business School. In 2024, she graduated from the Korea Advanced Institute of Science and Technology (KAIST) with a Master of Science in Information and Communication Technology.

== 2018 Miss Uganda pageant ==
During the 2018 Miss Uganda competition, Abenakyo beat 21 other contestants to win the crown. The competition was held at the Kampala Sheraton Hotel. The chief judge at the event was Zari Hassan, who also doubles as the patron of the Miss Uganda beauty pageant. She won a Toyota Wish compact multi-purpose vehicle. In addition, Abenakyo and the top two runners-up, Patience Martha Ahebwa and Trya Margach were awarded scholarships to the Uganda Aviation School that include airline cabin crew training.

== Miss World 2018 ==
Abenakyo represented Uganda at the Miss World 2018 competition, held in Sanya, China, in December 2018, it is world’s oldest running international beauty pageant. In the head to head segment of the competition, she was paired with Miss Argentina Victoria Soto. Abenakyo talked about her support for the girl child in her project she called "Fighting Teenage Pregnancies". All three judges voted for her, sending her into the Top 30 in the competition, the first Ugandan contestant to rise this high, in the history of the Miss World beauty pageant. She finished in the top 5 the highest ranking any Ugandan contestant reached at Miss World. She was crowned Miss World Africa. The current state minister of tourism in Uganda reported that the government is in contention to make Quiin Abenakyo the tourism ambassador of Uganda since she has become a global icon after finishing as Top 5 overall at Miss World 2018 behind, Vanessa Ponce of Mexico (Miss World 2018) and Nicolene Pichapa Limsnukan of Thailand, the runner-up with Kadijah Robinson of Jamaica and Maria Vasilevich of Belarus ended up in the Top 5.

== See also ==
- Miss Uganda
- Enid Mirembe
- Dora Mwima
