= Tourism in Uganda =

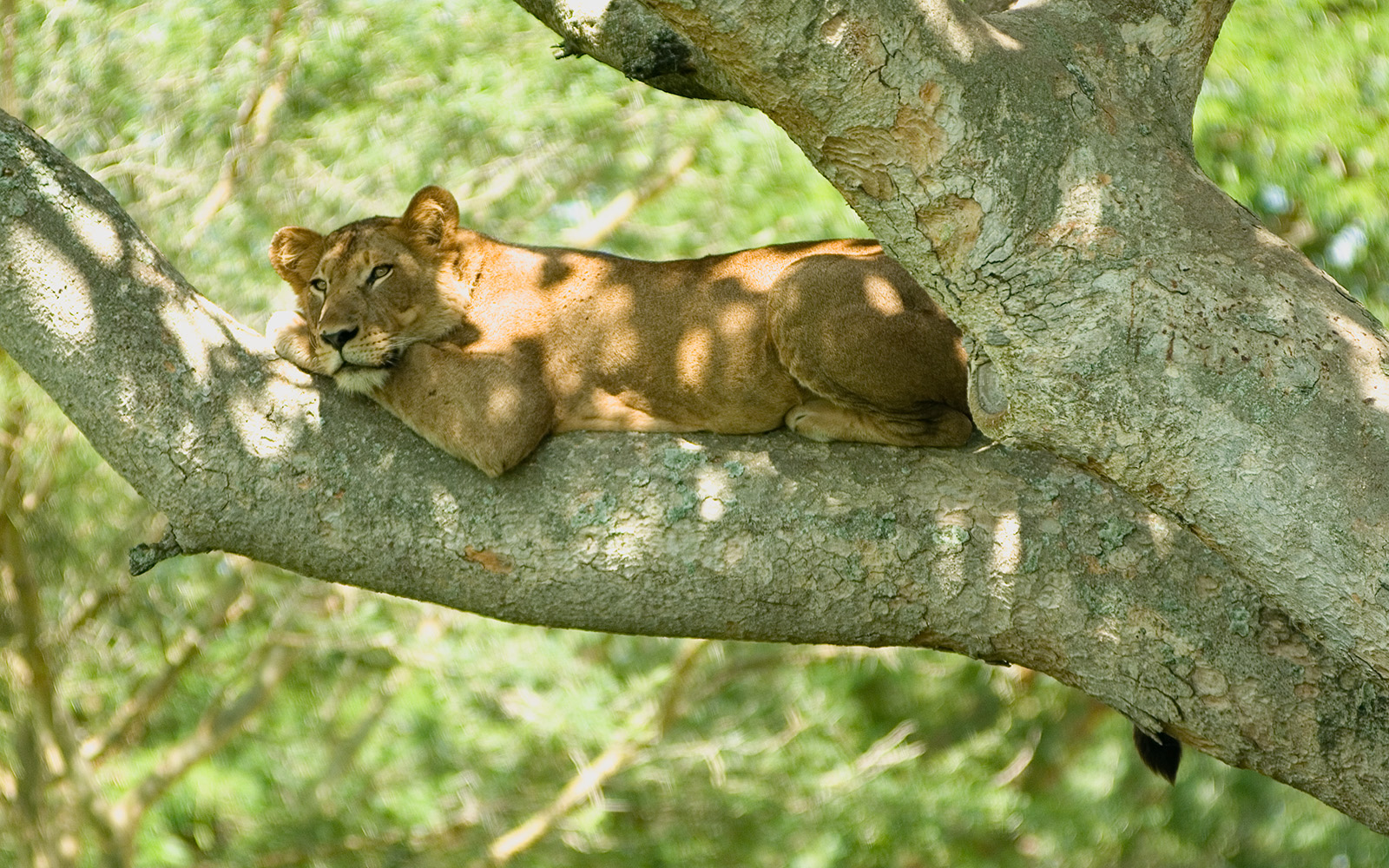
A tree-climbing lioness in Queen Elizabeth National Park.

Tourism in Uganda is focused on Uganda's landscape and wildlife. It is a major driver of employment, investment and foreign exchange, contributing USh 4.9 trillion (US$1.88 billion or €1.4 billion as of August 2013) to Uganda's GDP in the financial year 2012–2013.

Tourism can be used to fight poverty in Uganda. There are the tourism companies which employ people directly as drivers, guides, secretaries, accountants etc. These companies sell products to tourists, for example art and crafts, traditional attire. Tourism can also be operated online by the online based companies. Tourist attractions in Uganda include national game parks, game reserves, traditional sites, and natural tropical forests. Traditional occasions like Mbalu in eastern Uganda, boat riding, waterfalls etc.

== History ==
Tourism in Uganda has its roots to when future prime minister Winston Churchill visited the nation in 1907 and dubbed it as the "Pearl of Africa" for its colourful nature.

In the late 1960s, Uganda was visited by 100,000 international tourists each year. Tourism was the country's fourth largest earner of foreign exchange. The tourist industry ended in the early 1970s because of political instability. By the late 1980s, Uganda's political climate had stabilised and conditions were suitable for reinvestment in Uganda's tourist industry.

However, the loss of charismatic wildlife in previously popular safari parks such as Murchison Falls National Park and Queen Elizabeth National Park prevented these parks from competing with similar tourist attractions in neighbouring Kenya and Tanzania. Uganda's tourist industry instead promoted its tropical forests. The keystone of the new industry became Bwindi Impenetrable National Park. With more than 300 mountain gorillas, Bwindi Impenetrable National Park has approximately half of the world's population of mountain gorillas.

In October 2014 the Ugandan government's Ministry of Tourism, Wildlife and Antiquities released the 2014–2024 Tourism Development Master Plan with support from the United Nations World Tourism Organization and the United Nations Development Programme. Among other strategies, the Plan divides the country up into several geographical "Tourism Development Areas."

== Tourist numbers ==
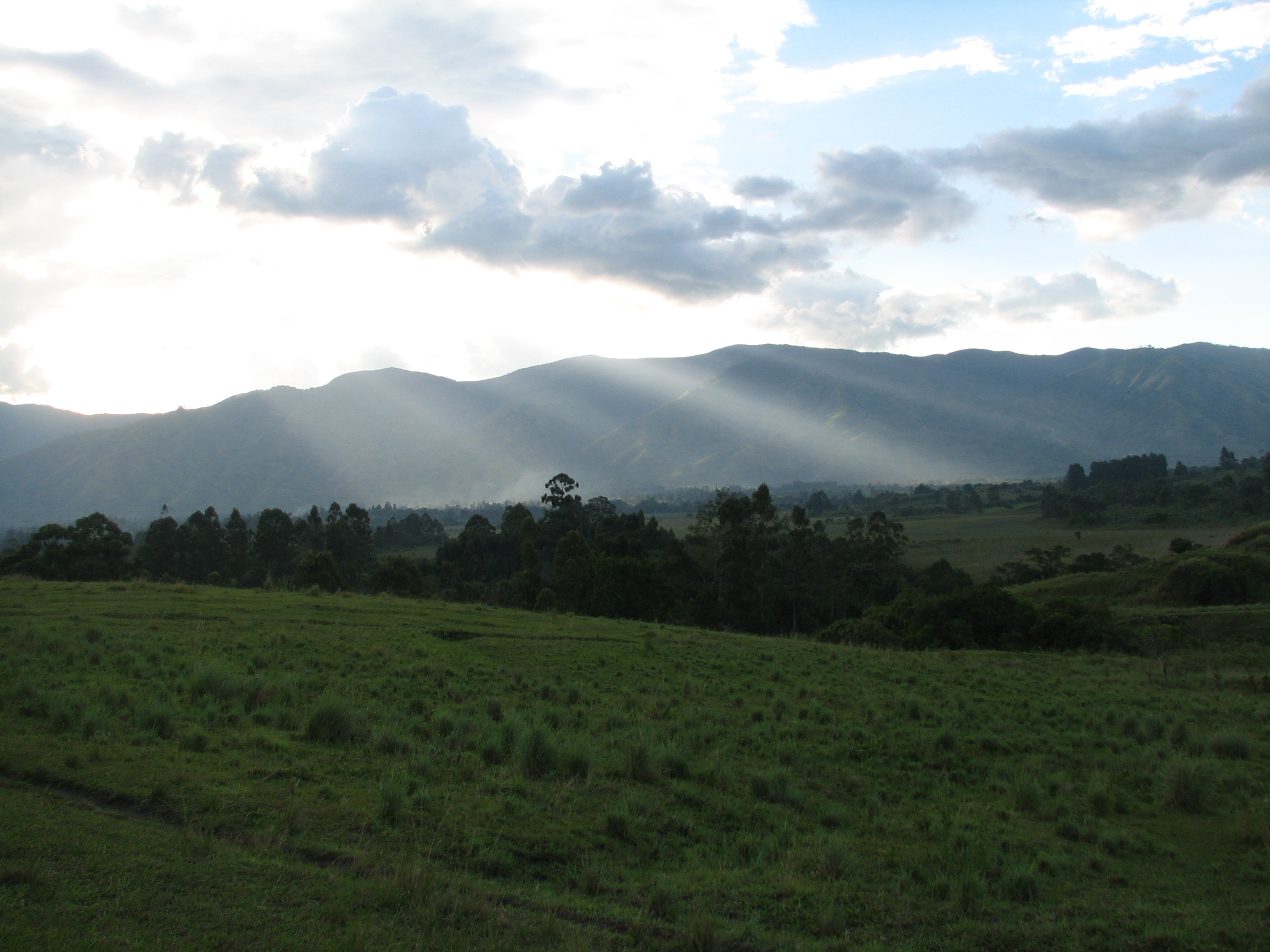
The Rwenzori Mountains in southwestern Uganda.

Presently, the Ministry of Tourism, Wildlife and Antiquities and the Uganda Tourism Board maintain information along with statistics pertaining to tourism for the country. There has been increased investment in tourism, particularly in travel accommodation and related facilities; this has enhanced tourists' experience in the country.

Adventure tourism, ecotourism and cultural tourism are being developed. About three-quarters of Uganda's tourists are from other African countries. Kenya, which borders Uganda, is the biggest source of tourists to Uganda, making up almost half of all arrivals into the country. The number of visitors from Tanzania, Rwanda, the Democratic Republic of the Congo, and Sudan is quite low.

As Uganda is a landlocked country, it is very dependent on connections through Kenya for most of its transport. International travellers sometimes prefer to fly into Nairobi before connecting to Uganda's capital Kampala as this is often cheaper. Below is a table showing the number of tourists that have visited Uganda's national parks between 2006–2010. In 2012 Uganda was awarded Number 1 in "Top Countries & Travel Destinations 2012" by Lonely Planet.

National Parks	2006	2007	2008	2009	2010	2011	2012	2013
Murchison Falls National Park	26,256	32,049	35,316	39,237	53,460	56,799	60,803	70,799
Queen Elizabeth National Park	43,885	51,749	53,921	62,513	76,037	88,407	58,172	69,193
Kidepo Valley National Park	959	795	1,633	2,924	3,208	2,452	2,300	2,890
Lake Mburo National Park	12,508	14,264	16,539	17,521	20,966	20,864	22,927	14,068
Rwenzori Mountains National Park	948	1,583	2,020	1,281	1,529	1,798	1,663	2,724
Bwindi Impenetrable National Park	10,176	9,585	10,362	11,806	15,108	16,997	18,259	21,695
Mgahinga Gorilla National Park	2,071	2,676	3,303	1,886	3,328	7,661	2,497	8,951
Semliki National Park	1,942	1,342	1,732	2,701	3,393	3,152	3,591	5,752
Kibaale National Park	6,969	7,651	7,383	7,799	9,482	7,530	10,372	15,782
Mount Elgon National Park	2,964	3,472	3,708	2,943	2,660	2,334	1,565	2,096
Total	108,678	125,166	135,917	150,611	189,171	207,994	182,149	213,950

=== Arrivals by country ===
Most visitors arriving to Uganda on short term basis in 2013 were from the following countries:

Rank	Country	Number
1	Kenya	380,614
2	Rwanda	280,431
3	Tanzania	74,485
4	United States	56,766
5	(Democratic Republic of the Congo) DR Congo	49,925
6	United Kingdom	43,009
7	South Sudan	38,538
8	Burundi	34,115
9	India	28,647
10	South Africa	21,184

== Tourist attractions ==
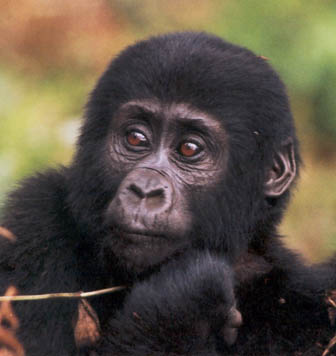
A juvenile mountain gorilla in Bwindi Impenetrable National Park.

Uganda has a diverse culture, landscape, flora, and fauna.

=== Game and bird viewing ===
Game viewing is the most popular tourist activity in Uganda. Wild animals like lions, buffaloes, giraffes, antelopes, elephants are common in Uganda’s ten national parks. Uganda is one of only ten countries where it is possible to visit endangered gorillas.

Mountain gorillas are Uganda's prime tourist attraction. The vast majority of these are in Bwindi Impenetrable National Park, with a few others in Mgahinga National Park, both in southwestern Uganda. In Bwindi, visitors have been allowed to view the mountain gorillas since April 1993. The development of gorilla tourism and the habituation of gorillas to humans is proceeding very carefully because of the dangers to gorillas, such as contracting human diseases.

Meanwhile, Queen Elizabeth National Park is home to the tree climbing lions. Lions do not normally climb trees, except when chased by another lion group or wild buffalo. However the tree climbing lions found in QE-NP intentionally climb trees and rest on them in the afternoon, when the sun is high. This is a unique phenomenon. There have only been rare similar sightings of this in Lake Manyara National Park of Tanzania.

=== Boating and water sports ===
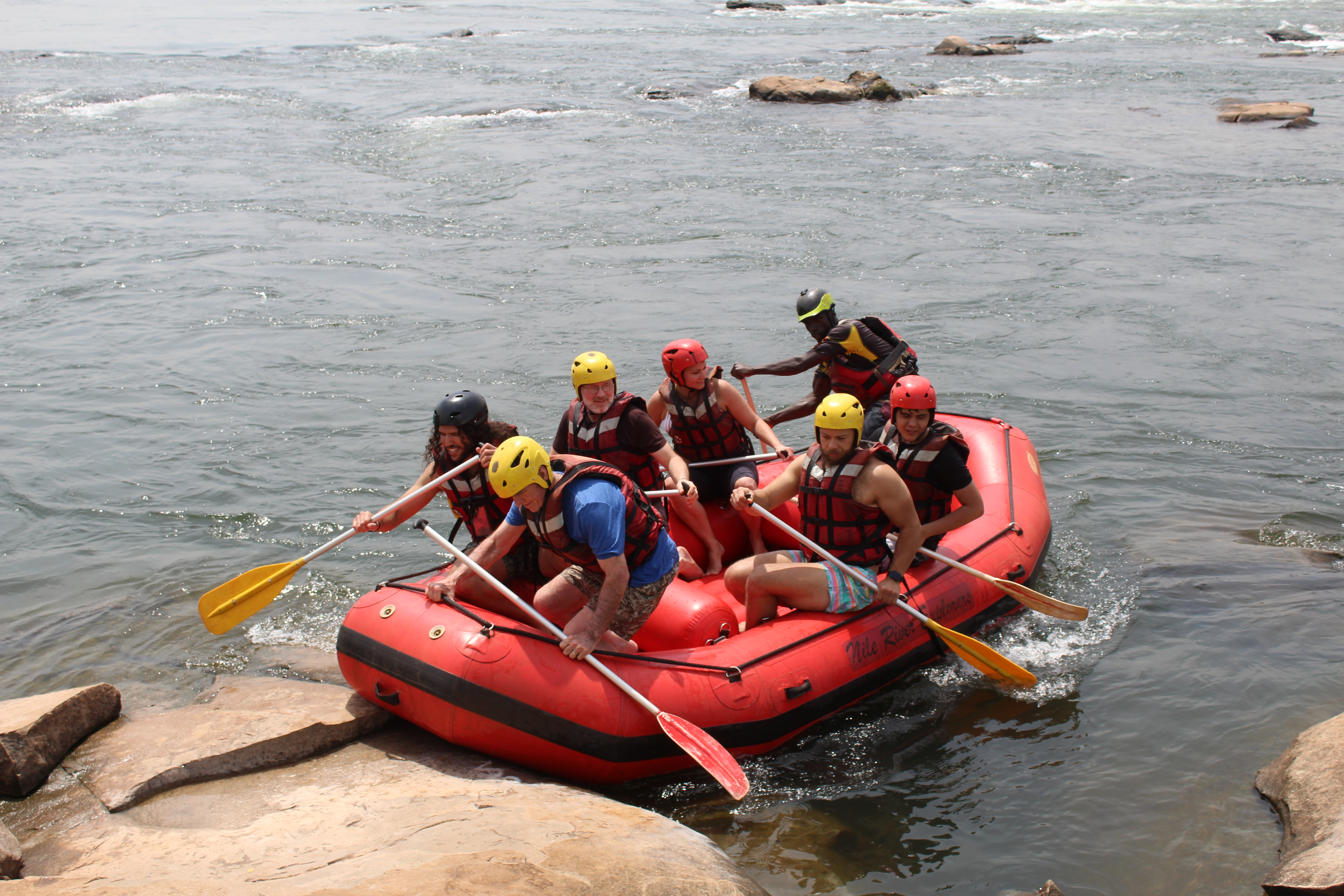
People rafting on the source of the Nile in Uganda.

With its prime location in the African Great Lakes region, Uganda has a variety of water bodies that are popular spots for tourism. White water rafting and kayaking are popular activities on the rapids near the source of the Nile at Jinja.

Boating which is commonly done on Lake Victoria, Lake Mburo, Lake Bunyonyi, Kazinga Channel, and River Nile is a perfect way of exploring the buffaloes, hippos, crocodiles and a wide variety of bird species that inhabit the banks of these water bodies. Sport fishing is another favorite tourist activity. Fish like the Nile perch, and tilapia can be caught in designated areas of Lake Mburo and the banks of the Nile. Canoeing can also be done at Lake Bunyonyi.

=== Hiking and mountain climbing ===
Uganda has many opportunities for mountain climbing, hiking and nature walks. The Rwenzori Mountains, which are found at the border with the DRC, include the snowcapped Margherita Peak (5109 m), the highest Mountain Range in Africa and also one of the highest peaks. Mgahinga Gorilla National Park also includes three peaks, Mount Gahinga, Mount Sabyinyo, and Mount Muhavura, the highest peak in the national park. Mount Elgon, located in Eastern Uganda, can be used for hiking and climbing, and also has one of the largest calderas in the world.

=== Religious tourism ===
Religious tourism is a steadily growing tourism product niche in Uganda after wildlife-based tourism. However, limited research has curtailed planning and development of religious tourism in the country.

=== Cultural sites ===
Uganda has many cultural sites.

- Kasubi Tombs:

A UNESCO World Heritage Site, originally Kabaka Muteesa I's palace (1880-1884), the graves of Muteesa I, Mwanga II, Daudi Chwa and Muteesa II are found in the main house which was reconstructed after a fire in 2010.

== Read also ==
- National Cultural Sites of Uganda
- Protected Areas in Uganda
