= Santa Anzo =

Ugandan fashion designer and entrepreneur

- Born: 1975 (age 50–51); Uganda
- Citizenship: Ugandan
- Education: Madhvani College (O-Level); Progressive Secondary School (High School Diploma); Dolphins Fashion College (Diploma in Fashion Design)
- Occupations: Fashion designer, entrepreneur
- Years active: 1995–present
- Known for: ARAPAPA Fashion House; Uganda International Fashion Week

Santa Anzo (born c. 1975) is a Ugandan fashion designer and entrepreneur. She is the founder and lead designer of ARAPAPA Fashion House and Design Studio and the founder and president of Uganda International Fashion Week (UIFW), an annual fashion expo held in Kampala that brings together designers, models, textile producers, and investors in the fashion industry.

== Background and education ==
Anzo was born in Kampala, Uganda around 1975. Her family traces its origins to Moyo District in the West Nile sub-region of northern Uganda. According to some accounts, her family went into exile in South Sudan following the fall of Idi Amin's government in 1979 and later returned to Uganda in 1982.

She was homeschooled in exile by her mother Chezira Iku Dolo before returning to Uganda for formal education. She attended Old Kampala Primary School and later Bat Valley Primary School where she completed her primary education. She pursued O-level studies at Madhvani College in Wairaka, Jinja District, and A-level studies at Progressive Secondary School in Bweyogerere, Wakiso District.

She later enrolled at Dolphins Fashion College in Kampala, graduating with a Diploma in Fashion Design.

== Career ==
=== Early career ===
Anzo began her professional career in 1995 as a waitress at Kampala Casino while pursuing modelling part-time. She later worked as a modelling consultant at the Geraldine Modeling Agency and was elected chairperson of the Pearl of Africa Modelling Association, an early umbrella body for models in Uganda.

In 1999, Anzo co-founded Ziper Models, where she served as manager responsible for marketing and sales. Her responsibilities included financial management, model training, show production, and choreography. She left the company after approximately sixteen months.

=== ARAPAPA Fashion House and Design Studio ===
In 2001, Anzo founded ARAPAPA Fashion House and Design Studio in Kampala. The name Arapapa means "butterfly" in the Madi language, spoken in her family's region of origin.

The fashion label produces Afrocentric couture and ready-to-wear collections that draw inspiration from African cultural heritage.

Through her work, Anzo has collaborated with corporate and development partners on initiatives promoting fashion entrepreneurship and youth mentorship in Uganda.

=== Uganda International Fashion Week ===
In 2003, Anzo founded Uganda International Fashion Week (UIFW), an annual fashion event aimed at creating a platform for African designers, models, and fashion entrepreneurs.

The event has featured designers from across Africa and serves as a forum for networking and promoting the business side of the fashion industry.

=== International showcases ===
Anzo has presented her fashion collections at several international fashion events and showcases including the Africa Fashion Exchange in Durban, South Africa.

She has also showcased at events including Swahili Fashion Week in Dar es Salaam, Tanzania, Mozambique Fashion Week, and other regional fashion exhibitions.

In 2025, she was reported to have been appointed as a goodwill ambassador to the World Fashion Exhibition.

== Recognition and awards ==
- 2006 – Presidential Transformers Appreciation Award, Kampala.
- 2012 – Second place, East African Designer of the Year, Swahili Fashion Week.
- 2015 – Lifetime Fashion Icon Achievement Award.
- 2016 – Pioneer Ground Breaking Award from the Uganda Women Entrepreneurs Association in partnership with the International Labour Organization.
- 2018 – Keynote speaker at the Fashionpreneur Summit hosted by the Abryanz Style and Fashion Awards (ASFAs) in Kampala.
- 2021 – Keynote speaker at the Intra-African Trade Fair organised by Afreximbank.

== See also ==
- Anita Beryl
- Patricia Akello
- Abbas Kaijuka
- Stella Atal
- Abryanz
- Fatumah Asha
