= Ministry of Tourism, Wildlife and Antiquities (Uganda) =

Government ministry of Uganda

Coordinates: 00°19′02″N 32°34′47″E

- Coat of Arms of Uganda

Ministry overview
- Superseding Ministry: Ministry of Tourism, Wildlife and Heritage (Uganda)
- Jurisdiction: Government of Uganda
- Headquarters: 2nd Floor; Rwenzori Towers; 6 Nakasero Road; Nakasero, Kampala, Uganda
- Website: Homepage

The Uganda Ministry of Tourism, Wildlife and Antiquities (MTWA) is the cabinet-level ministry responsible for the promotion of tourism, the preservation and welfare of wildlife, and the preservation, improvement and safekeeping of natural and other national historic sites and monuments.

== Location ==
The headquarters of the ministry are located on the 2nd Floor, Rwenzori Towers at 6 Nakasero Road, in the Central Division, of Kampala, the capital and largest city of Uganda. The coordinates of the headquarters are 0°19'02.0"N, 32°34'47.0"E (Latitude:0.317223; Longitude:32.579723).

== Administration ==
Administratively, the ministry is divided into the following departments:

- Department of Tourism Development - responsible for the coordination of the tourism responsibilities of the ministry. These include the collection, tabulation, analysis, and dissemination of tourism statistics. The department liaises with the Uganda Tourism Board and the Hotel and Tourism Training Institute in performing their tasks.
- Department of Wildlife Conservation - responsible for "the formulation, monitoring and evaluation of implementation of policies, national plans, legislation, guidelines, and strategies on conservation and development of wildlife resources, and provide appropriate and timely advice to government".
- Department of Museums and Monuments - tasked to promote, protect and present the natural and cultural heritage of Uganda by collecting, conserving, studying and disseminating information.

== Leadership ==
The political leader of the ministry is Minister Hon. Col. (Rtd) Tom R. Butime. The State Minister for Tourism is Hon. Martin Mugarra Bahinduka since 24 June 2021.

== List of ministers ==
=== Minister of Tourism, Wildlife and Antiquities ===
- Tom Butime (6 June 2016 – present)
- Maria Mutagamba (15 August 2012 - 6 June 2016)
- Ephraim Kamuntu (27 May 2011 - 15 August 2012)
- Serapio Rukundo (1 June 2006 - 27 May 2011)

=== Minister of Trade, Industry, Tourism and Wildlife ===
- Daudi Migereko (12 January 2005 - 1 June 2006)

== Leadership ==
- Cabinet of Uganda
- Government of Uganda
