= Miss Uganda =

Beauty pageant

Miss Uganda beauty pageant Miss Uganda World Organization
- Formation: 1967
- Headquarters: Kampala
- Location: Uganda
- Official language: English; Swahili
- National director: Brenda Nanyonjo
- Key people: Kezzi Entertainment Limited
- Affiliations: Miss World
- Website: www.facebook.com/Miss-World-Uganda-380367352024034/

Miss Uganda or Miss Uganda World is a national beauty pageant in Uganda.

== History ==
The Miss Uganda pageant began in 1967, with the winner participating at Miss World. Only one Miss Uganda has reached the finals since its inception.

In 2014, Salim Saleh announced a collaboration between the Miss Uganda Foundation, the organizers of the annual contest, and the Wealth Creation program that Saleh heads. "We are almost signing a Memorandum of Understanding with the Miss Uganda Foundation because we want to choose the next Miss Uganda basing on agriculture and this is intended to interest the young people into the sector," Saleh said.

== Titleholders ==
- : Declared the winner
- : Finished as runner-up or top 5/6 qualification
- : Finished as one of the finalists or semi-finalists
- : Finished as special awards winner

Miss Uganda World has started to send a Winner to Miss World since 1967. On occasion, when the winner does not qualify (due to age) for either contest, a runner-up is sent.

Year	Miss Uganda World	Placement at Miss World	Special awards
2027	Almorie Nagayi	TBA	
2026	Elle Muhoza	Unplaced	
2025	Natasha Nyonyozi	Top 40	Beauty With a Purpose (Africa); Top 20 at Head-to-head challenge
2024	No competition held		
2023	Hannah Karema Tumukunde	Top 8	
2022	Due to the impact of COVID-19 pandemic, no representative in 2022		
2021	Elizabeth Bagaya	Unplaced	
2020	Due to the impact of COVID-19 pandemic, no representative in 2020		
2019	Oliver Nakakande	Top 40	Miss World Top Model (top 10); Miss World finals (Top 20); Miss World Sport (top 32)
2018	Quiin Abenakyo	Top 5	Miss World Africa; Miss World head-to-head challenge winner; Miss World global vote
2017	Did not compete		
2016	Leah Kagasa	Unplaced	
2015	Zahara Nakiyaga	Unplaced	
2014	Leah Kalanguka	Unplaced	
2013	Stellah Nantumbwe	Unplaced	
2012	Phiona Bizzu	Unplaced	
2011	Sylvia Namutebi	Unplaced	Miss World Sport (top 24); Miss World Beach Beauty (top 20)
2010	Heyzme Nansubuga	Unplaced	
2009	Maria Namiiro	Unplaced	
2008	Dora Mwima	Unplaced	
2007	Monica Kasyate	Unplaced	
2006	Did not compete		
2005	Juliet Ankakwasa	Unplaced	Miss World Talent (top 16)
2004	Barbara Kimbugwe	Unplaced	Miss World Beach Beauty (top 20)
2003	Aysha Salma Nassanga	Unplaced	
2002	Rehema Ni Nakuya	Unplaced	
2001	Victoria Kabuya	Unplaced	
Did not compete between 1998 and 2000
1997	Lillian Acom	Unplaced	
1996	Sheba Kerere	Unplaced	
1994	Grace Mungoma	Unplaced	
1993	Linda Bazalaki	Unplaced	
1992	Olga Nampima	Unplaced	
Did not compete in 1991
1990	Jessica Kyeyune	Unplaced	
1989	Doreen Lamon-Opira	Unplaced	
1988	Nazma Jamal Mohamed	Unplaced	
Did not compete between 1986 and 1987
1985	Helen Acheng	Unplaced	
Did not compete between 1969 and 1984
1968	Joy Lehai Kanyarutokye	Unplaced	
1967	Rosemary Salmon	Unplaced	
