= Stellah Nantumbwe =

Ugandan actress (born 1991)

- Born: Stella Nantumbwe; 1991 (age 34–35)
- Education: University of Greenwich (Bachelor of Science in Business Computing)
- Occupations: Beauty Pageant Contestant, Pageant Coach & Actress
- Years active: 2013–present
- Known for: Miss Uganda & Big Brother Africa

Stellah Nantumbwe also Stella Nantumbwe commonly known as Ellah is a Ugandan actress, media personality and beauty pageant titleholder who won Miss Uganda 2013. She was Uganda's representative to the Big Brother Africa, in 2014.

== Background and education ==
She was born in Uganda to Angella Nakiyonga and Rogers Nsereko, circa 1991. She is the last born, in a family of twelve children. Stella attended Buganda Road Primary School and Kabojja Junior School for her elementary schooling. She transferred to Kabojja International Secondary School for her O-Level education. The studied at Vienna College Namugongo, for her A-Level studies. She then joined the University of Greenwich in South-East London, in the United Kingdom, graduating with a Bachelor of Science degree in Business Computing, in 2012.

== Career ==
In 2013, at the age of twenty two, Ellah auditioned for Miss Uganda and was crowned Miss Uganda Central Region. At the national beauty pageant competition, held at the Kampala Serena Hotel. On 13 July 2014, Stellar won the Miss Uganda crown and was also voted Miss Popularity. In September 2013, Stella represented Uganda at Miss World 2013, in Bali, Indonesia.

She represented Uganda on season nine of Big Brother Africa in 2014 and was evicted in the elimination process before the unveiling of the winner.

Ellah has also worked in film and television as an actress and presenter. She played the lead role of Isabella Arroyo in the Ugandan version of El Cuerpo del Deseo from 2016 to 2017. The series was nominated at Uganda Entertainment Awards in 2017 for Best TV Series. She has also played supporting roles in other films and television series in Uganda and Nigeria. She played a supporting role in Bella, a Matt Bish film in 2017. She also guest presented Scoop on Scoop on Urban TV in 2018.

Ellah also coaches beauty pageants and models. She has herself modeled for a number of brands. She was one of the judges on Miss Uganda 2018. She is also the vice president of Africa Music Industry Awards (AMI Awards) since 2018.

== Filmography ==
| Year | Film/Television | Role | Award |
|---|---|---|---|
| 2013 | Big Brother Africa | Herself (Ellah) | Reality television show. Her shortened name Ellah was popularized on Big Brother Africa (season 9). |
| 2016 | Second Chance | Isabella Arroyo | Lead Role/Debut Role, telenovela drama remake of El Cuerpo del Deseo |
| 2017 | Bella | | Supporting role in a Matt Bish inspirational film starring Cindy Sanyu. |
| 2018 | Scoop on Scoop | Herself | Celebrity news talk show |
