= Moses Golola =

Ugandan kickboxer

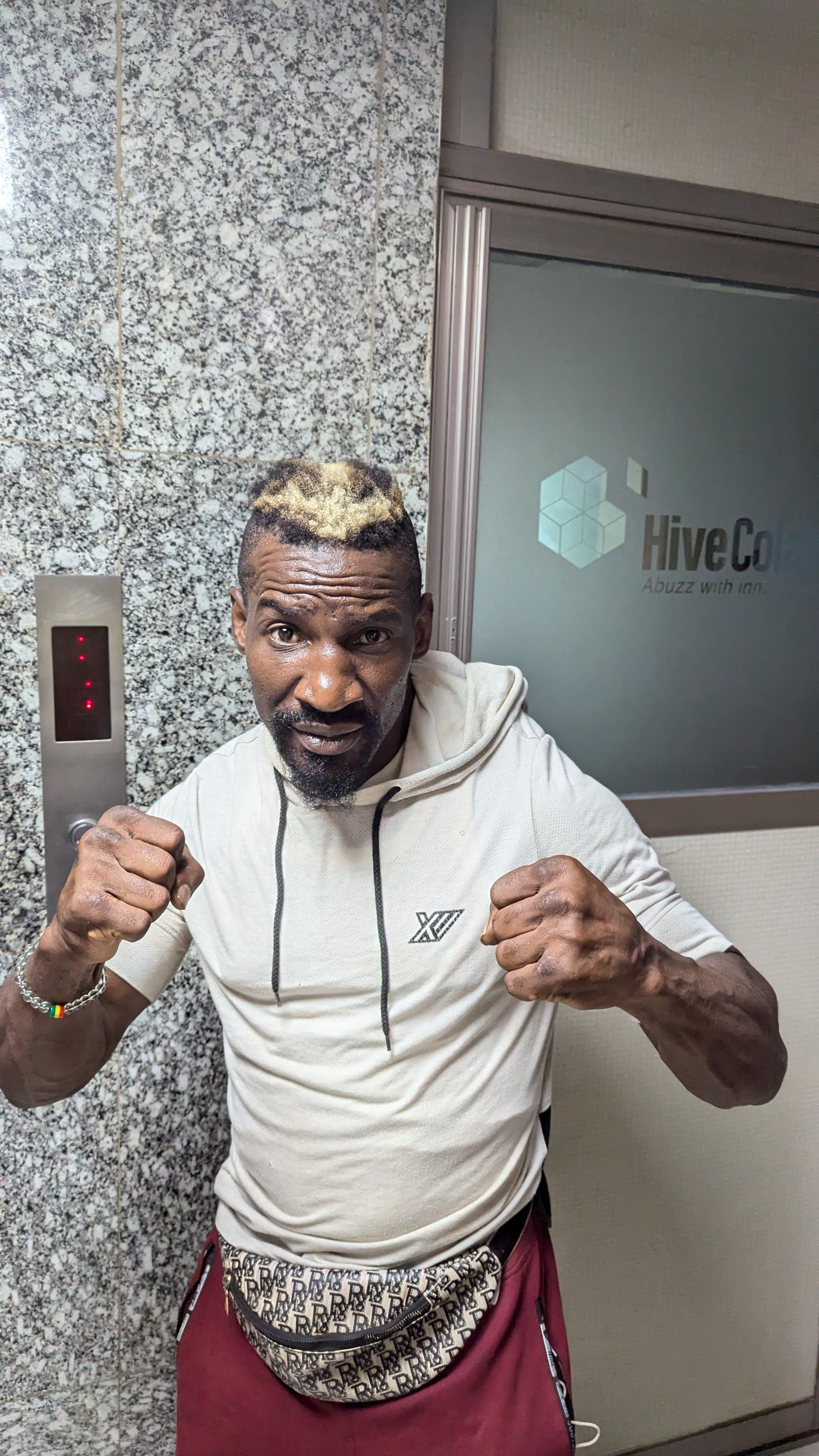
- Moses Golola in 2023
- Born: May 22, 1980 (age 45); Uganda
- Known for: Popularizing kickboxing in Uganda
- Title: Kickboxing Champion of East and Central Africa

Golola Moses (born 22 May 1980) is a Ugandan kickboxer and actor.

== Career ==
The accomplishments as a kick boxer have been questioned by the media in Uganda, with accusations ranging from rigged events, to outright fraud, Golola has, nevertheless, been credited with popularizing the sport of kickboxing in Uganda, a discipline which previously generated minimal fan interest in Uganda. He has managed to build up a large fan following in Uganda. His 2011 fight against Abdul Qadir Rahim managed to attract the largest attendance in Uganda outside of Ugandan national football team matches and Golola has perhaps the largest fan following in Uganda outside of the national football team.

Golola has one of the largest online fan bases of in Uganda. His fans have created various memes associated with him, and even their own parody version of Downfall, starring Golola. He was also given the lead role in the Ugandan movie Christmas in Kampala.

Golola is known for his humorous personality and flamboyant showmanship, traits which have helped him to popularize the sport of kickboxing in Uganda and helped him to gain a large fan following.

He is the Kickboxing Champion of East and Central Africa having emerged winner in a controversial match against Hungarian Andras Nagy on 9 December 2011. Golola was involved in a financial dispute with his promoter at that time, Patrick Kanyomozi, and claimed that he was owed 30 million Ugandan shillings as his part of a 40–60 split from the fight. The dispute later caused him to split with Kanyomozi and introduce his own brother as his promoter.

=== Vs Semata ===
Fans have been divided on who is better between Umar Semata and Golola. On 13 October 2018, the two faced off in the ring at Freedom City Mall. The fight ended when Umar Semata had stopped Golola's dominance of local kickboxers after the judges awarded him a victory by unanimous decision. Meanwhile, till now Moses Golola says he did not lose the fight as it was not staged according to the agreed upon instructions of seven rounds instead of five.
