= Enid Mirembe =

Ugandan beauty pageant contestant

- Born: 1993 (age 32–33); Kampala, Uganda
- Citizenship: Uganda
- Education: Makerere University
- Occupations: Founder Rolex Initiative CEO and Teamleader at Rolex Festival Miss Tourism Uganda Busoga region 2015/16 Woman Member of parliament Bugiri district contestant 2020, 11th Parliament
- Years active: 2014 to present
- Known for: Founding the annual Rolex Festival
- Title: Culinary Tourism enthusiast and ambassador, Entrepreneur
- Website: rolexinitiative.com

Enid Mirembe, is a Ugandan beauty pageant contestant, who was crowned "Miss Tourism Busoga Region" on 26 July 2015. In 2016, as an entrepreneur she founded the Rolex initiative organisation and Rolex Festival a flagship culinary event on Uganda's Tourism Calendar. She was named as one of "The 40 Movers and Shakers of 2016" by Satisfashion Uganda, a Ugandan fashion magazine. She also contested for Woman Member of Parliament Bugiri District in 2020, 2026 and also contested for EALA MP in 2026.

== Background and education ==
She was born in Kampala District, in 1993. After attending local schools for her elementary and secondary school education, she was admitted to Makerere University, Uganda's largest and oldest public university. She graduated in 2016 with a Bachelor of Arts degree.

== Career ==
While in her third year of undergraduate studies at Makerere University, she competed in the Miss Tourism Beauty Pageant, representing Busoga sub-region. The contest was organised by the Uganda Tourism Board and he Uganda Ministry of Tourism.

During her tenure, she organized what is called a "Rolex Festival". A rolex is a food item consisting of an egg omelette and vegetables wrapped in a chapati. Rolexes are consumed widely in many of Uganda's urban areas. The Festival consists of street vendors of this food preparing the food in large quantities on the street of the target city or town, with customers meandering through the cook-stations, sampling, buying and consuming as the mingle. Enid Mirembe continued to organize these festivals even after her tenure as the beauty queen expired. However under her organisation Rolex Initiative, she has worked hard through the seasoned training programs called Rolexprenuer which geared with support from UNDP through their incubating partner Ministry of Tourism Wildlife and antiquities where they build capacity for 2000 youths in Rwwnzori Tourism Development Area (TDA).

== See also ==
- Dora Mwima
- Patricia Akello
