= Patricia Akello =

Ugandan professional model (born 1992)

- Born: 1992 (age 33–34); Kampala, Uganda
- Citizenship: Uganda
- Occupation: Model
- Years active: 2014–present
- Known for: Modelling
- Modeling information
- Agency: Muse Management (New York); Fusion Models (Cape Town); M4 Models (Hamburg)

Patricia Akello, also Tricia Akello, is a Ugandan professional model, currently signed with the Muse Model Management company in New York City. She walked the 2017 New York Fashion Week, in September, working for the Bottega Veneta brand and was featured in the cover of Women’s Wear Daily magazine.

== Background and education ==
Akello was born in Nsambya Hospital in Uganda's capital, Kampala, in 1992. Her mother, Santa To-kema and her father Patrick To-kema, both traced their heritage to Pader District, in the Acholi sub-region of the Northern Region of Uganda.

She attended ABC Nursery School, then ABC Primary School for her early education. She transferred to Comprehensive College Kitetika, in Wakiso District, for both O-Level and A-Level schooling, graduating in 2010.

== Career ==
In 2011, right out of high school, Akello began looking for a modelling agency to sign her up, without finding any takers. In 2014, she met Aamito Stacie Lagum, another Ugandan model, who had just returned from an engagement outside the country. Lagum invited Akello to the upcoming welcome party. Lagum connected Akello with Joram Job Muzira, Lagum's manager, who signed her up under the Joram Model Management Agency. Akello began work and modeled during the 2014 Kampala Fashion Week. During that week she modeled outfits by fashion designers Gloria Wavamunno and Sylvia Owori.

After the event in Kampala, Akello's agent informed her of a modelling scout who wanted to sign her up with a modelling agency in South Africa. Akello was flown to South Africa and signed with Fusion Models Agency, in Cape Town, on a three-year contract. Under that contract, she walked in Mercedes-Benz Fashion Week, in Berlin, in 2015 and 2016.

In August 2016, Akello relocated from Cape Town to New York City and was signed by the Muse Model Management Agency. She is also concurrently signed up with MP Management in Paris, and M4 Models Management in Germany.

Akello travels between assignments in at least seven cities on three continents (Africa, Europe and North America), visiting her native Uganda every Christmas.
