= Sylvia Owori =

Ugandan fashion designer and entrepreneur (born 1972)

- Born: 1972 (age 53–54); Uganda
- Education: Newham College (B.A., Fashion Design); Derby University (Bachelor of Business Management)
- Occupations: Fashion designer; modeling agent, entrepreneur, civil servant
- Years active: 1999—
- Known for: Fashion design, business acumen, civil service
- Title: Chairman & CEO, Zipa Modeling Agency

Sylvia Owori (born 1972) is a Ugandan fashion designer, entrepreneur and civil servant. She is founder, owner, Chairperson and Chief Executive Officer of Zipa Modeling Agency. She is a public official in the Office of the President in the Ugandan Government, having been appointed as Director of Operations at Operation Wealth Creation (OWC) on 28 December, 2020.

== Early life, family and education ==
Owori was born in Uganda c. 1972, one of seven siblings. She attended Nsambya Senior Secondary School, in Kampala, Uganda's capital and largest city. She studied at Newham College in London, beginning at the age of 19, graduating with a qualification in fashion design. She also holds a bachelor's degree in Business from the University of Derby.

== Career ==
After her education in the UK, Owori returned to Uganda and opened Sylvie's Boutique. It initially sold imported clothes. It maintains its headquarters at Garden City Mall in Kampala's central business district. Other locations are located at Mabirizi Complex, also in Kampala, and in Kilimani, a section of Nairobi, the capital of Kenya. As of December 2009, it employed 80 people in both countries.

In the late 1990s, Owori began designing and manufacturing clothes for herself and her friends. In 2000, Sylvia Owori was selected to design the clothes worn by the contestants at the MNet Face of Africa in Dar es Salaam and Cape Town. The following year, in 2001, she was selected to design the clothes worn by the Ugandan finalist at the Nokia Face of Africa competition. From 2001 to 2004, Sylvia Owori took charge of organizing the Miss Uganda beauty Pageant. In 2004, she launched her own clothing line under the Sylvia Owori label. In 2005, she launched Africa Woman Magazine, a glossy monthly publication with circulation in Uganda, Kenya, Rwanda, South Sudan, and Tanzania. Owori designed and manufactured the costumes for the lead actors, actresses, and part of the cast of the film The Last King of Scotland, released in 2006. She is also the founder and owner of Zipa Modeling Agency, a leading fashion talent house in the African Great Lakes area.

In 2014, she started and became the host of The Style Project, a weekly educational, entertainment, fashion, and beauty programme in partnership with NTV Uganda. Owori left the show in 2017, when she was appointed as the Executive Assistant to General Caleb Akandwanaho, the Chief Coordinator of Operation Wealth Creation, a special civil-military operation initiated by President Yoweri Museveni. She was subsequently promoted to the Director of Operations in 2020. She is the head of all field operations and provides strategic, technical, and administrative support in terms of coordination, harmonisation, and collaboration of all activities of OWC.

== Personal life ==
Owori has two sons. One of the children, born in 2007, was fathered by Nasser Sebaggala, the former mayor of Kampala (2006–2011).
