= List of Tanzanian actors =

This is a list of notable actors and actresses from Tanzania listed in alphabetic order by surname. This list includes actors who are of Tanzanian descent or have a close connection to Tanzania.

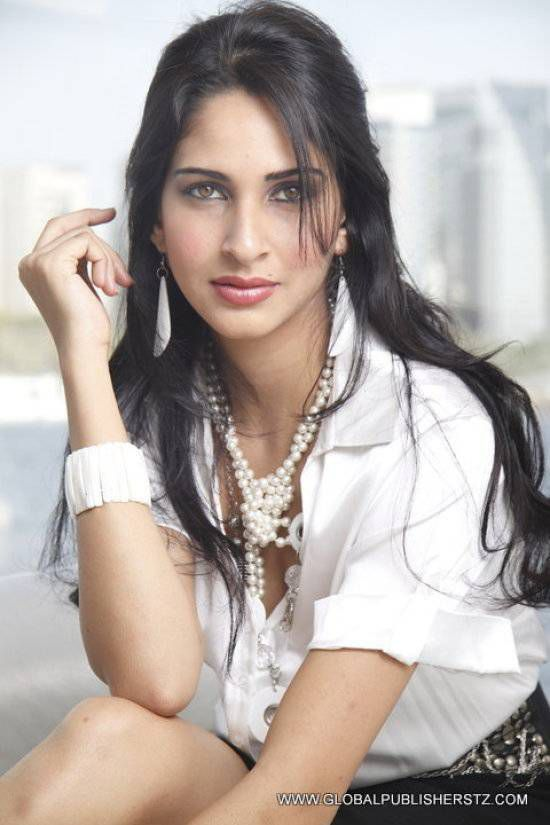
Richa Maria Adhia, 2023

== A ==
- Richa Adhia
- Meena Ally

== B ==
- Richard Bezuidenhout
- Ayoub Bombwe
- Bahati Bukuku

== C ==
- Yvonne Cherrie
- Mzee Chillo
- Cathryn Credo

== F ==
- Mohamed Fungafunga

== G ==
- Godliver Gordian

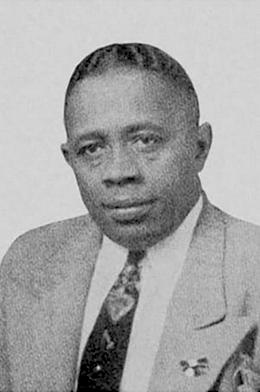
Bayume Mohamed Husen, before 1944

== H ==
- Bayume Mohamed Husen

== J ==
- Juma (actor)
- Bob Junior

== K ==
- Steven Kanumba
- Vincent Kigosi

== L ==
- Amandina Lihamba

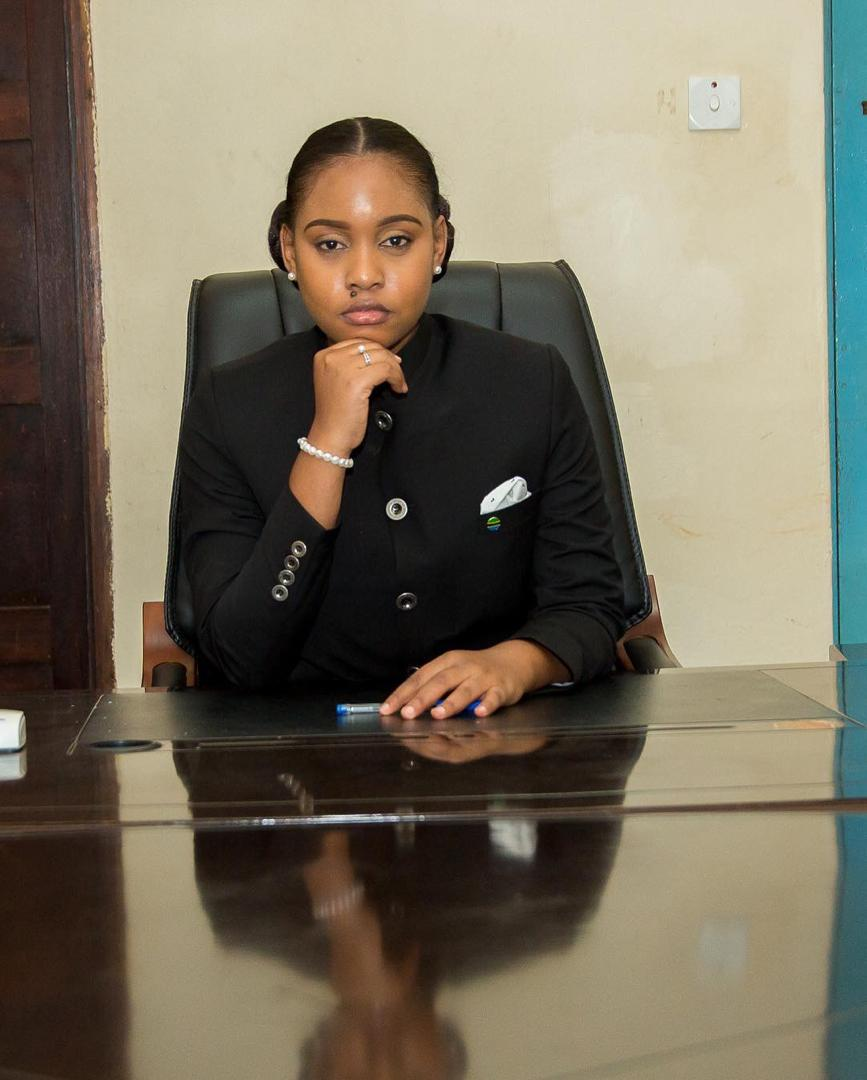
Jokate Mwegelo, 2018

== M ==
- Baby Madaha
- Mimi Mars
- Joseph Marwa
- Mzee Majuto
- Grace Mapunda
- Kajala Masanja
- Elizabeth Michael
- Jokate Mwegelo

== N ==
- Ernest Napoleon

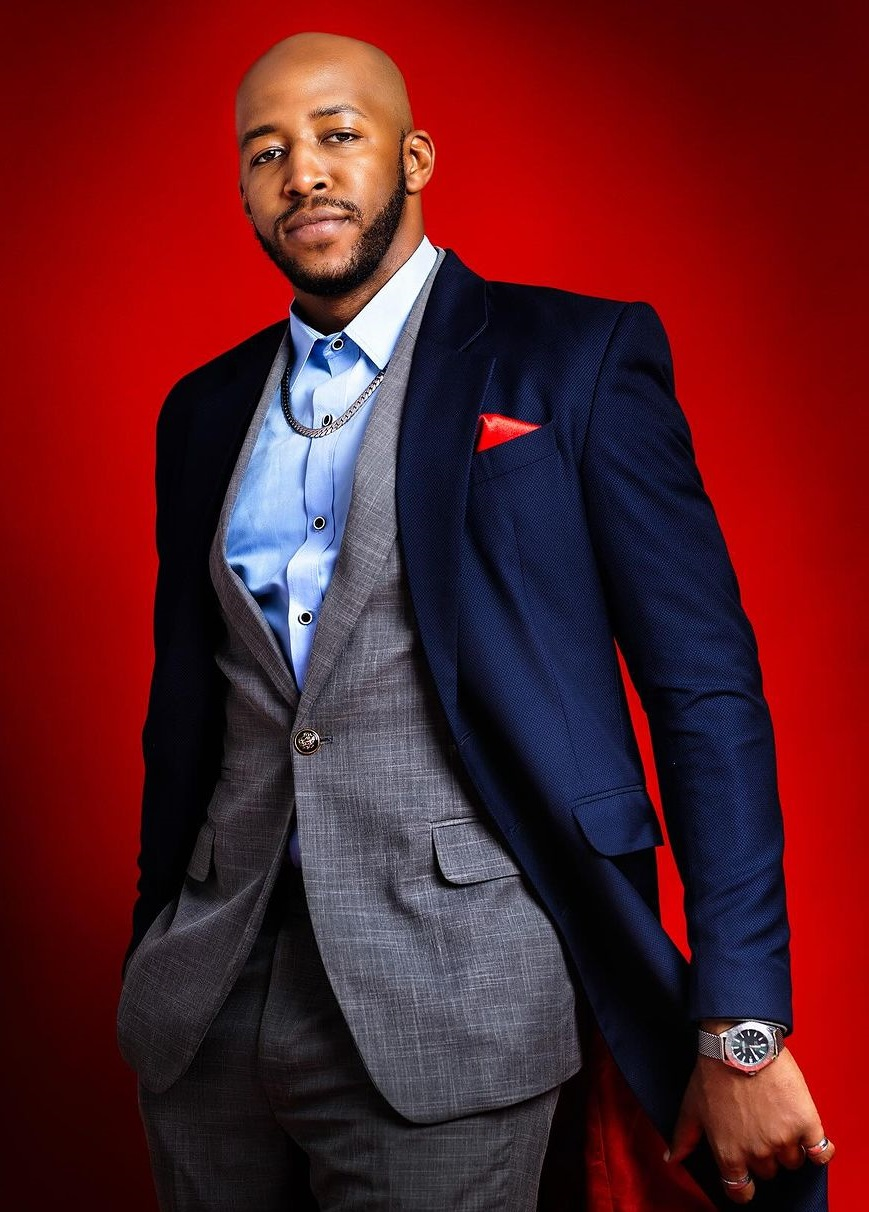
Idris Sultan, 2024

== S ==
- Edwin Semzaba
- Wema Sepetu
- Idris Sultan

== T ==
- Beatrice Taisamo

== U ==
- Irene Uwoya

== W ==
- Jacqueline Wolper

== See also ==
- List of Tanzanians
- Cinema of Tanzania
