= Cinema of Tanzania =

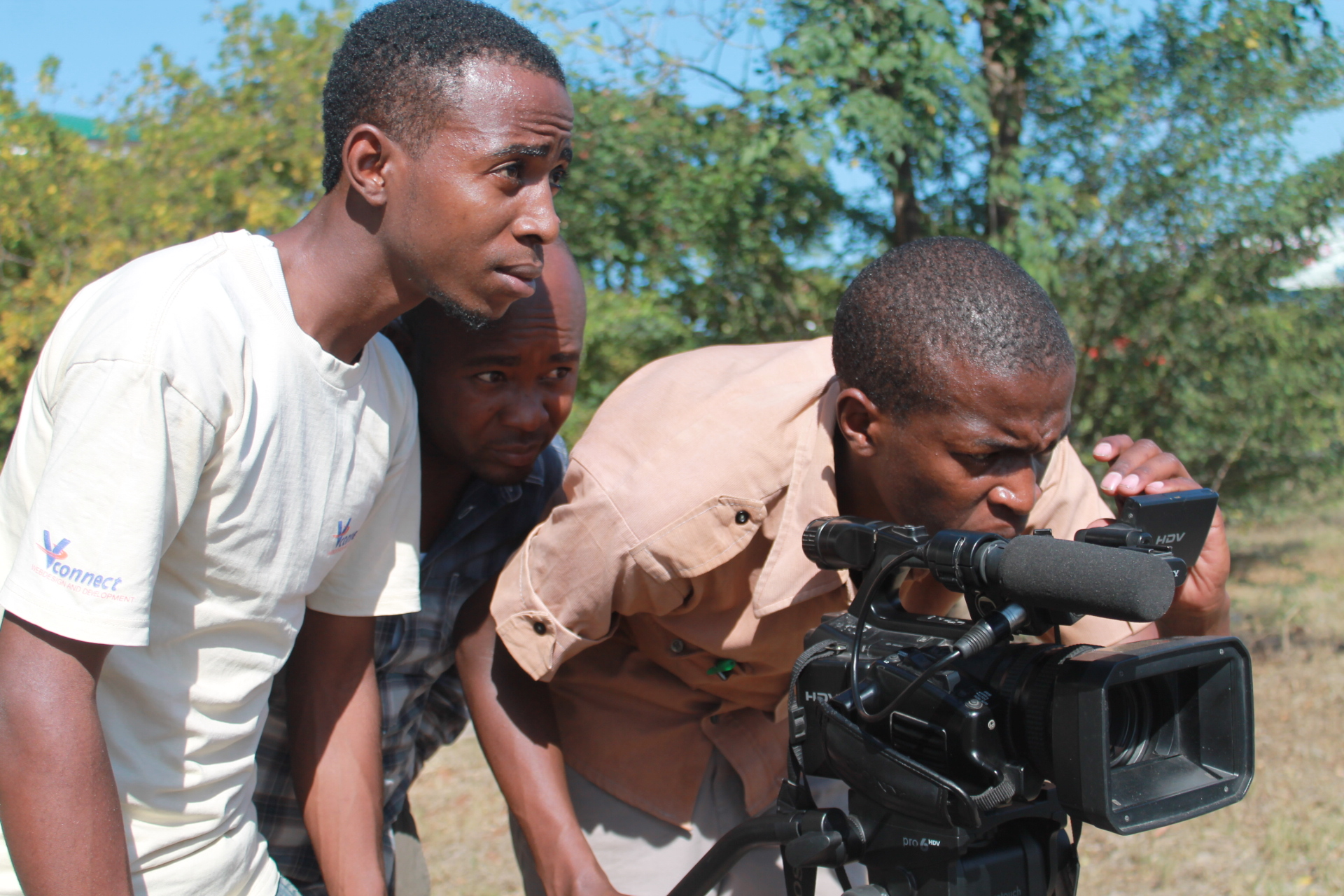
A film crew in Tanzania

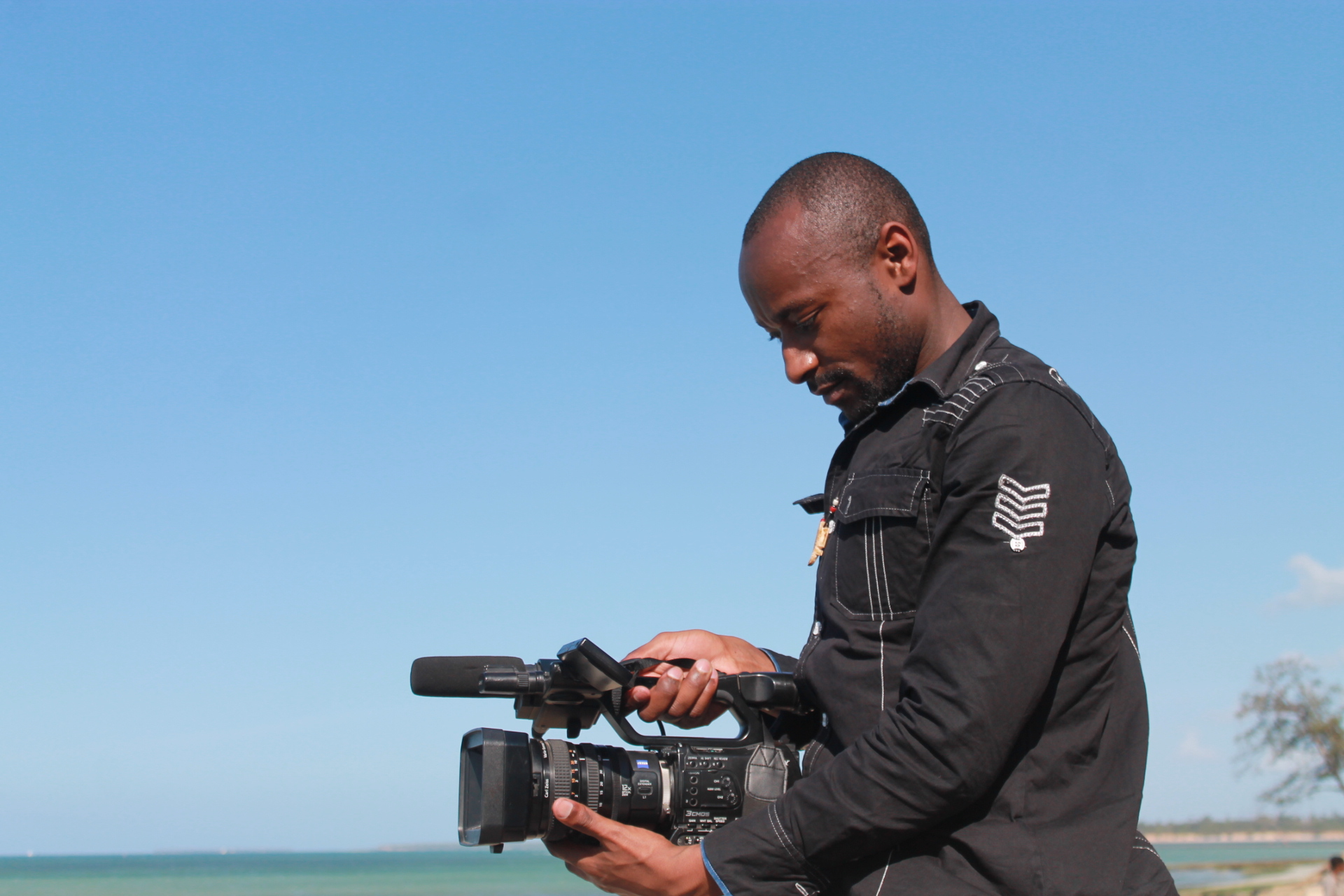
A filmmaker working in Tanzania

Tanzania's film industry, also known as Swahiliwood or Bongo movie (a portmanteau of Swahili, Tanzania's official language, and Hollywood) and Bongowood, was established around 2001.

Films produced with low budgets, short schedules and camcorders are referred to colloquially as "bongo films" and are mass-released in DVD format. In 2011, bongo films were produced on a regular basis, but only a few higher quality Tanzanian feature films have been released in cinemas.

The Zanzibar International Film Festival hosts films, workshops, exhibitions, Dhow races, music and performing arts, as well as panoramas of women, children and villages. The company movies are Steps Intertainment and Mzimuni Theatre Art.

== History ==
Tanzanians inherited parts of their cinematic culture from British colonialists, including the production of both commercial films and government-funded instructional films. After independence, the newly formed government led by the President Julius Kambarage Nyerere sent home South African film expats, and established the country's own film industry under the Ministry of Community Development.

South Africa was plagued by apartheid, and Tanzania and other independent African countries broke ties with them until it ended. Replacing the South African filmmakers were Yugoslavian filmmakers, who started aiding the film industry of Tanzania in 1963, helping establish the industry. Many of the films created during this time were instructional or educational, made by the government, and distributed across Tanzania.

Before Tanzania's independence in 1961, some foreign movies were filmed in Tanganyika and Zanzibar. Most Tanzanian film production studios today are based in Dar es Salaam.

== Tanzanian films ==
In 2001, Maangamizi: The Ancient One was the first film from Tanzania to be submitted for the Academy Award for Best Foreign Film. Since then, Vuta N'Kuvute (Tug of War), directed by Amil Shivji, has been the only other Tanzanian film submitted for that award, for 2022. Bongoland, a film about a US immigrant from Tanzania, was released in 2003. Mapenzi Ya Mungu (The Will of God) was released in 2014. Other notable films include Ni Noma, released in June 2016. Other movies from Mzimuni Theatre Arts include Inspector Seba (2008), Misukosuko (2010), Part of Job (2011), and Double J (Double Jimmy) (2013).

Well-known artists include Steven Kanumba, Blandina Chagula, Elizabeth Michael, Kajala Masanja, Jacqueline Wolper, Mzee Chillo, Nelly Kamwelu, Irene Uwoya, Baby Madaha, Wema Sepetu, Ernest Napoleon, Vincent Kigosi, Lucy Komba, Jimmy Mponda (J Plus), Sebastian Mwanangulo (Seba) and Charles Magari.

== Foreign films ==
Many foreign films were shot in and around Tanzania prior to independence, including adventure, romance and war movies.

Eight months of footage were required for the U.S. film Men of Two Worlds at Tanganyika in 1943. John Wayne's movie Hatari! was shot in Tanzania. Nature documentaries have been filmed in Tanzania, including a few parts of Impressionen unter Wasser and The Crimson Wing: Mystery of the Flamingos. In 1992, Dutch documentary Isingiro Hospital was made about a hospital in Tanzania treating AIDS patients. In 2010, filmmaker Nick Broomfield produced the documentary Albino United, about an albino football team in Tanzania in 2010, and filmed an adaption of the Ronan Bennett's novel The Catastrophist in the city of Mwanza.

== See also ==
- List of Tanzanian actors
