= Mkasi =

- Genre: Talk show
- Created by: Ambwene Yessayah; Salama Jabir
- Directed by: Josh Murunga
- Presented by: Salama Jabir; John Maroy; Mubah
- Theme music composer: Marco Chali (MJ Records)
- Country of origin: Tanzania
- Original language: Kiswahili
- No. of seasons: 11
- No. of episodes: 145

Production
- Executive producers: Salama Jabir; Ambwene Yessaya; Josh Murunga
- Editor: Joseph Munthali
- Running time: 26–30 minutes
- Production company: Mkasi TV Production

Original release
- Release: 2011 – present

Mkasi (Swahili for scissors) is a Tanzanian television talk show.

== Format ==
The show takes place at the Amaya Beauty Salon and Spa and in the show Salama Jabir and his friends gets to sit down with celebrities and interview them

== Episodes ==
=== Season 1 ===
#	Guest	Air Date
1	Irene Uwoya	12 November 2011
2	Slim A. Slim	19 November 2011
3	Masoud Kipanya	24 November 2011
4	Asha Baraka	5 December 2011
5	Nsajigwa Shedrack	12 December 2011
6	Mama Thabeet and Akbar	19 December 2011
7	Jaffarai	26 December 2011
8	Flaviana Matata	
9	Saleh Ally	
10	Bhoke Egina	16 January 2012
11	Steve Nyerere	23 January 2012
12	Wema Sepetu	
13	Nyoshi El Sadat	

=== Season 2 ===
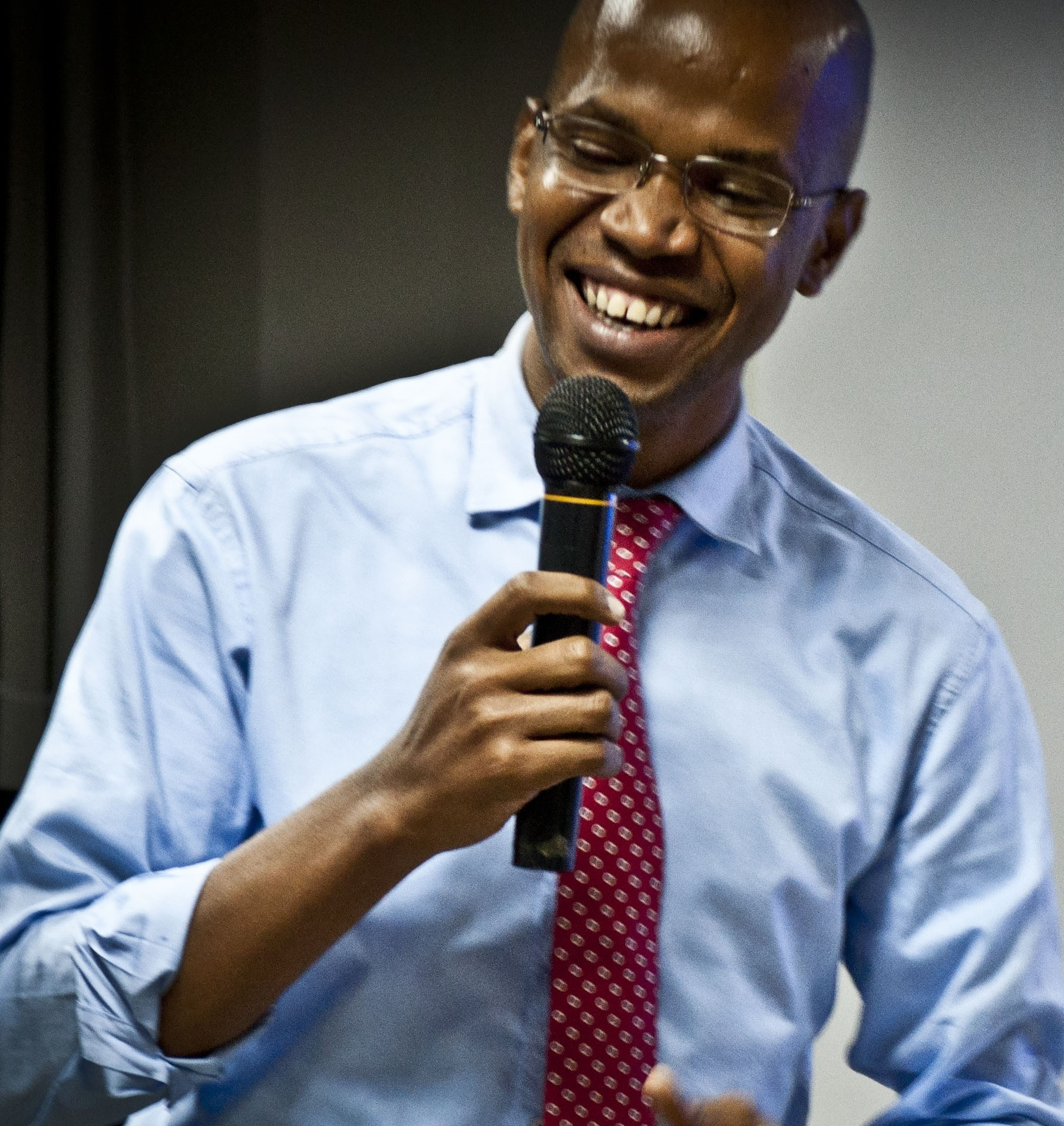
Makamba

Sykes

#	Guest	Air Date
1	Dida Wa G	13 February 2012
2	Eddie	20 February 2012
3	Steven Kanumba	27 February 2012
4	Mwana FA	5 March 2012
5	January Makamba	12 March 2012
6	Rita Paulsen	19 March 2012
7	Dully Sykes	26 March 2012
8	Elizabeth Michael	2 April 2012
9	Babu Sikare (Albino Fulani)	9 April 2012
10	Ali Choki	16 April 2012
11	Mwaipopo	23 April 2012
12	Isha Mashauzi	30 April 2012
13	Ephraim Kibonde	7 May 2012

=== Season 3 ===
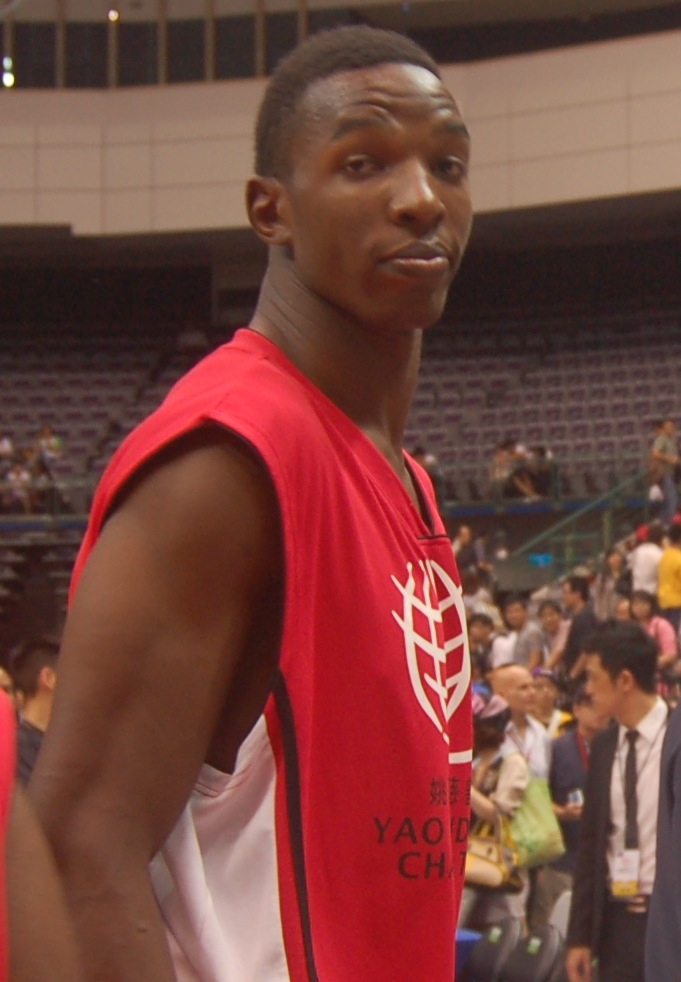
Thabeet

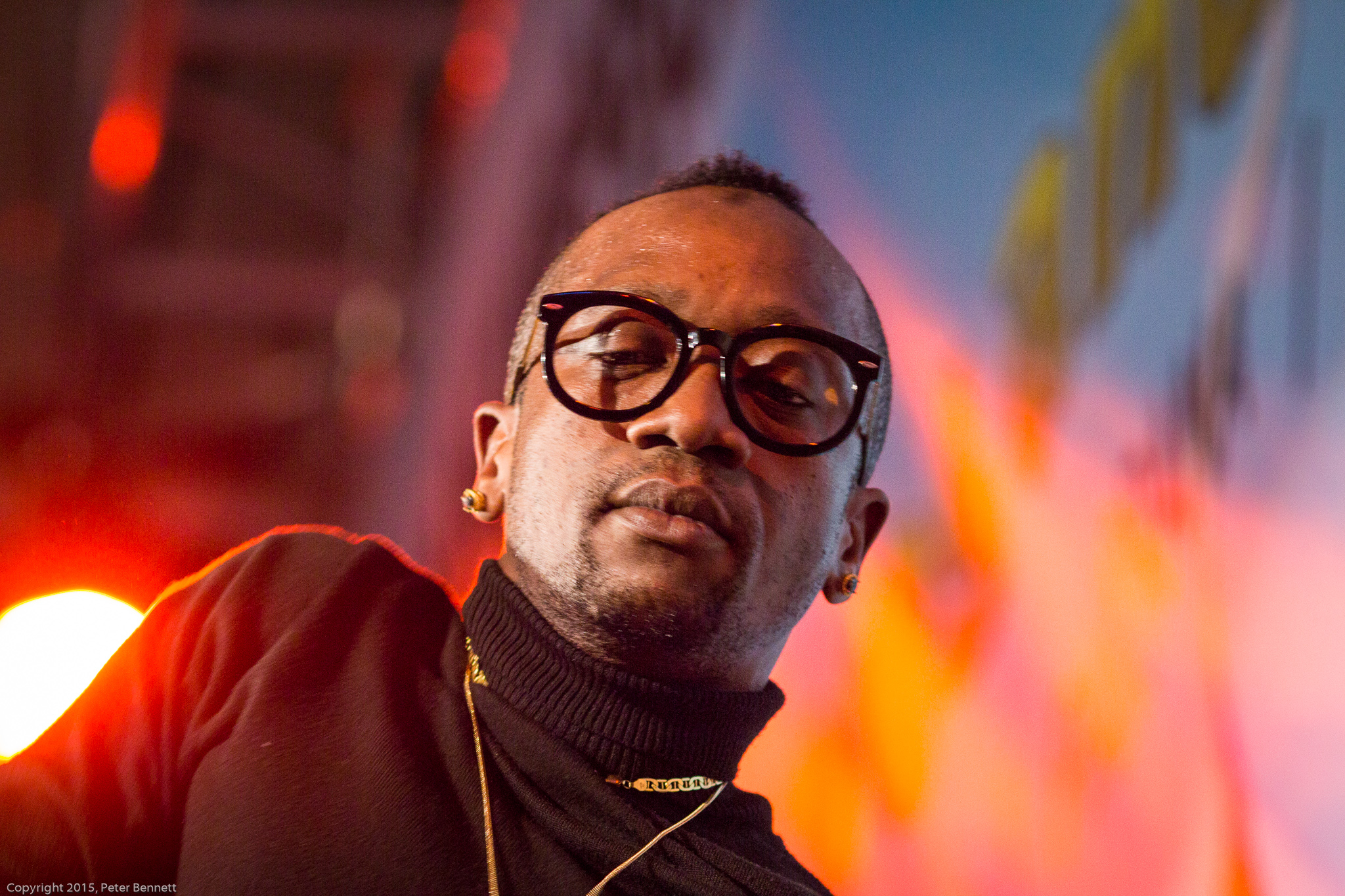
TID

#	Guest	Air Date
1	Frank Gonga and Freddy Nice	14 May 2012
2	Jose Mara, Lilian & Nyamwera	21 May 2012
3	BoniLuv, Venture & Makay	27 May 2012
4	Professor Jay	3 June 2012
5	Lawrence Masha	3 June 2012
6	Ray	18 June 2012
7	Nakaaya Sumari and Nancy Sumari	25 June 2012
8	Njenje	1 July 2012
9	Hasheem Thabeet	9 July 2012
10	Haji Manara	16 July 2012
11	Ismail Rage	23 July 2012
12	TID	30 July 2012
13	Zembwela	6 August 2012

=== Season 4 ===
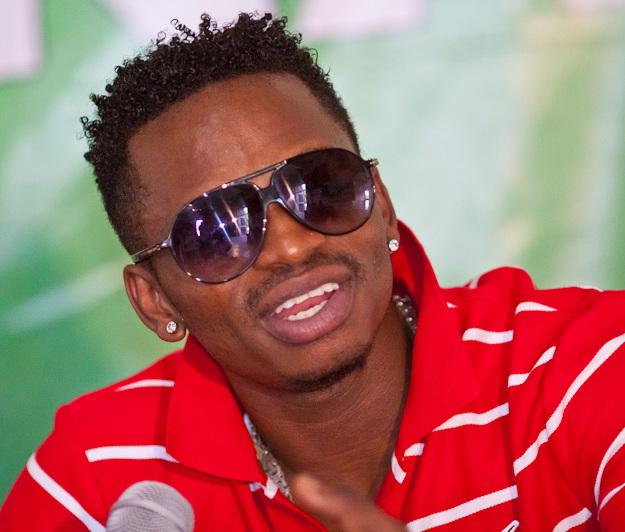
Diamond Platnumz

#	Guest	Air Date
1	Diamond Platnumz	13 August 2012
2	Banza Stone	20 August 2012
3	Saigon	27 August 2012
4	Barnabaz	3 September 2012
5	Prezzo	10 September 2012
6	Maulid Kitenge	17 September 2012
7	Muhogo Mchungu	24 September 2012
8	Rashid Matumla	2 October 2012
9	Mrisho Mpoto	8 October 2012
10	Bi Cheka	15 October 2012
11	Zoro's family	22 October 2012
12	Monalisa	29 October 2012
13	Godwin Gondwe	5 November 2012
14	Abby Cool	12 November 2012

Season 4 has 14 episodes.

=== Season 5 ===
#	Guest	Air Date
1	DJ JD	19 November 2012
2	Special 2012	26 November 2012
3	P Funk	3 December 2012
4	Sugu	10 December 2012
5	Jacqueline Wolper	17 December 2012
6	Taji Liundi	24 December 2012
7	Sajuki	1 January 2013
8	Nape Nnauye	7 January 2013
9	Mr Blue	14 January 2013
10	Lundenga	21 January 2013
11	Mad Ice	28 January 2013
12	Mzee Majuto	4 February 2013
13	Akanashe	11 February 2013

=== Season 6 ===
#	Guest	Air Date
1	Bi Chau	18 February 2013
2	Kingwendu	25 February 2013
3	Millard Ayo	4 March 2013
4	Khadija Kopa	11 March 2013
5	Man Water	18 March 2013

=== Season 6 New ===
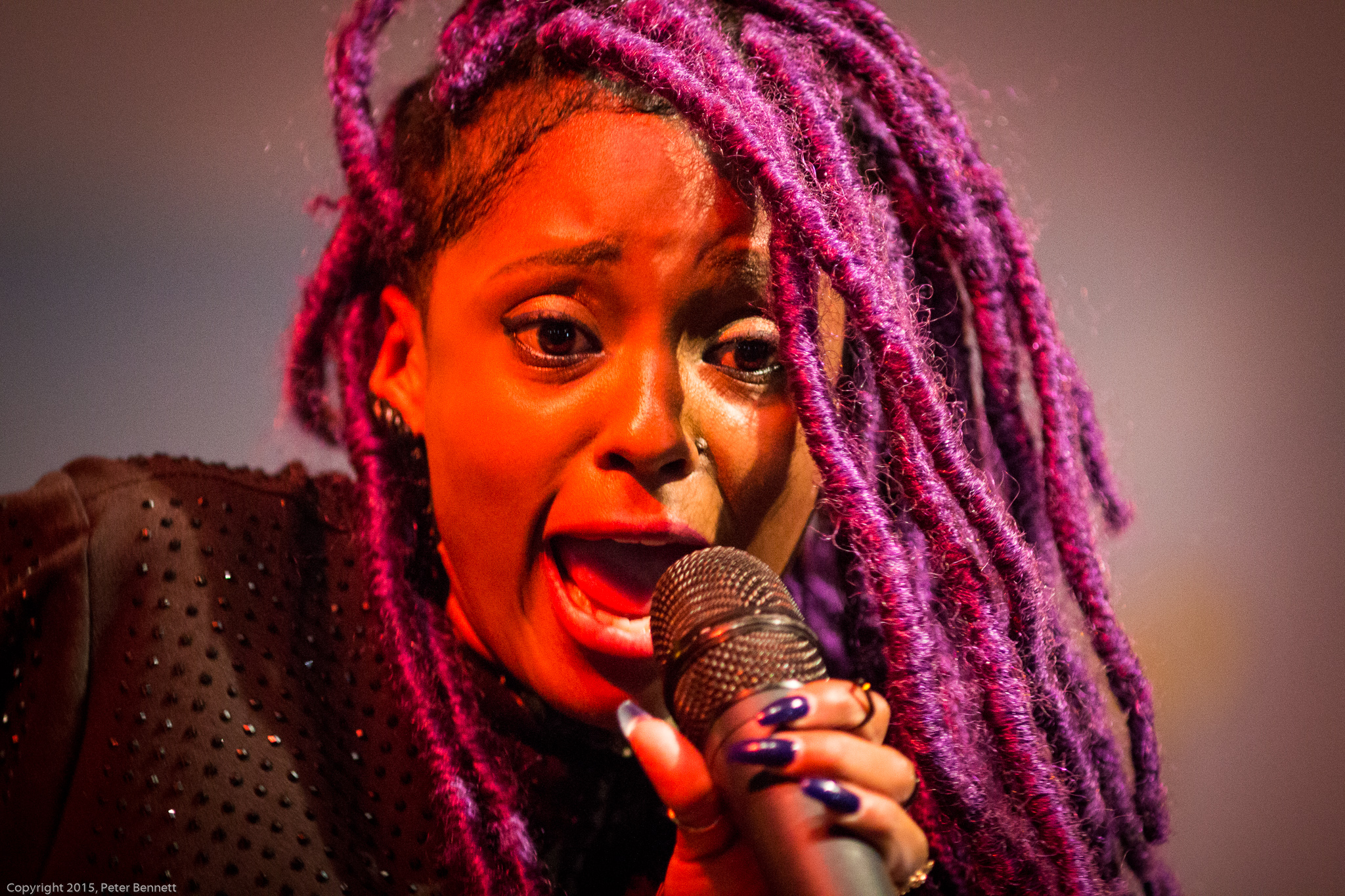
Vanessa Mdee

#	Guest	Air Date
1	Kajala Masanja	1 July 2013
2	Vanessa Mdee	8 July 2013
3	Jerry Silaa	15 July 2013
4	Abdallah Mwinyi	22 July 2013
5	Jokate Mwegelo	29 July 2013
6	Kali Ongala	5 August 2013
7	Babu Tale	12 August 2013
8	Juma Kaseja & Steve Nyerere	19 August 2013
9	Ally Rehmtullah	26 August 2013
10	Hemed Suleiman PHD	3 September 2013
11	Mzee Gurumo	9 September 2013
12	Shamim Mwasha & Miriam Odemba	16 September 2013

=== Season 7 ===
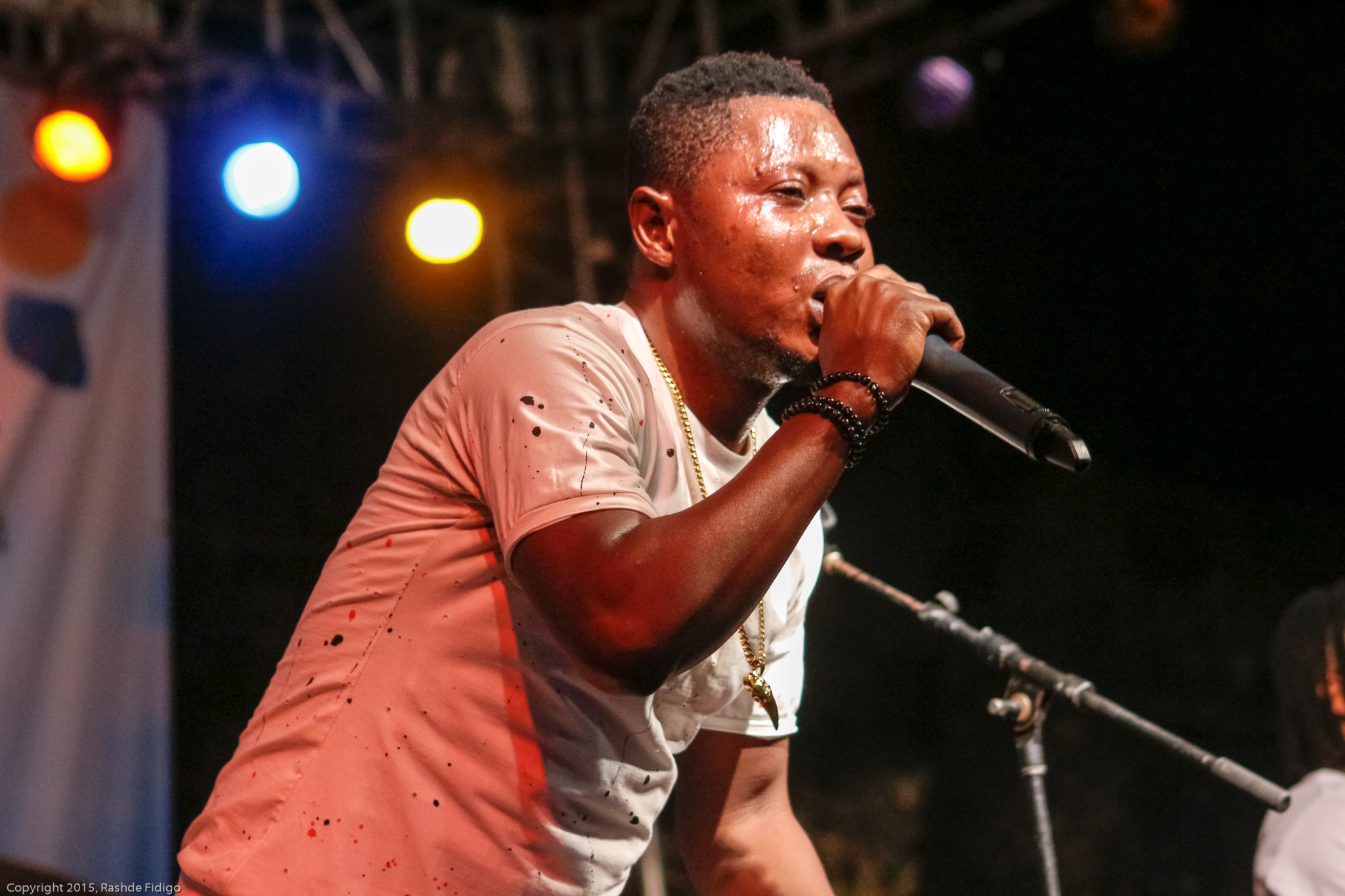
Christian Bella

#	Guest	Air Date
1	Julio	30 September 2013
2	Chidi Beenz	
3	Elizabeth Michael aka Lulu	
4	Christian Bella	
5	John Komba	
8	Afande Sele	
9	Gea Habibu	
10	Henry Mdimu	
11	Muumin Mwijuma	

=== Season 8 ===
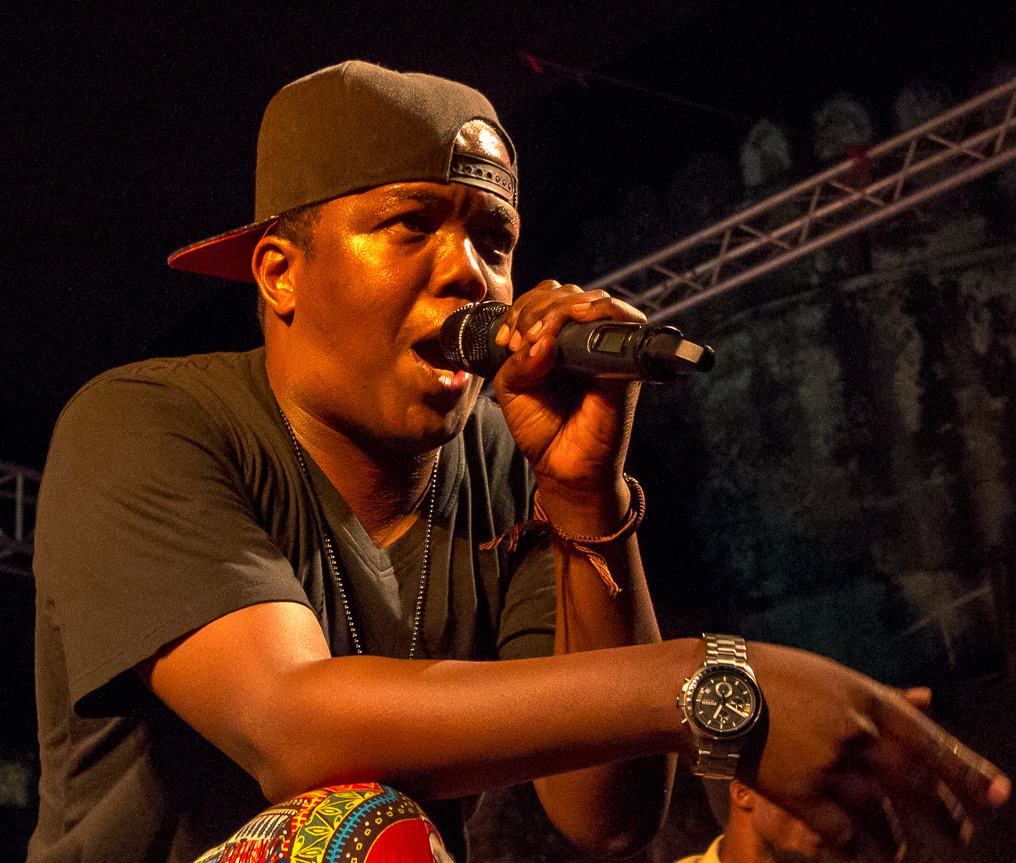
A.Y.

#	Guest	Air Date
1	Anthony Lusekelo	
2	King Dodoo	
3	Faraja Nyalandu	
4	Wadananda	
5	Dude	
6	Martin Kadinda	
7	Albert Msando	
8	Inspector Haroun	
9	Alex Msama	
10	Luiza Mbutu	
11	D Knob	
12	Muyenzi Gamba	
13	A.Y.	

=== Season 9 ===
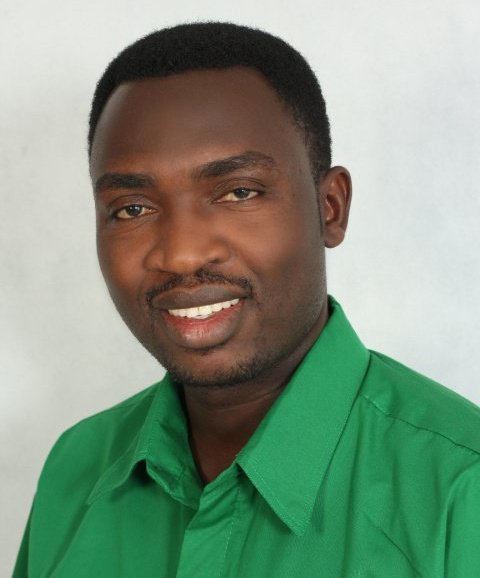
Kigwangalla

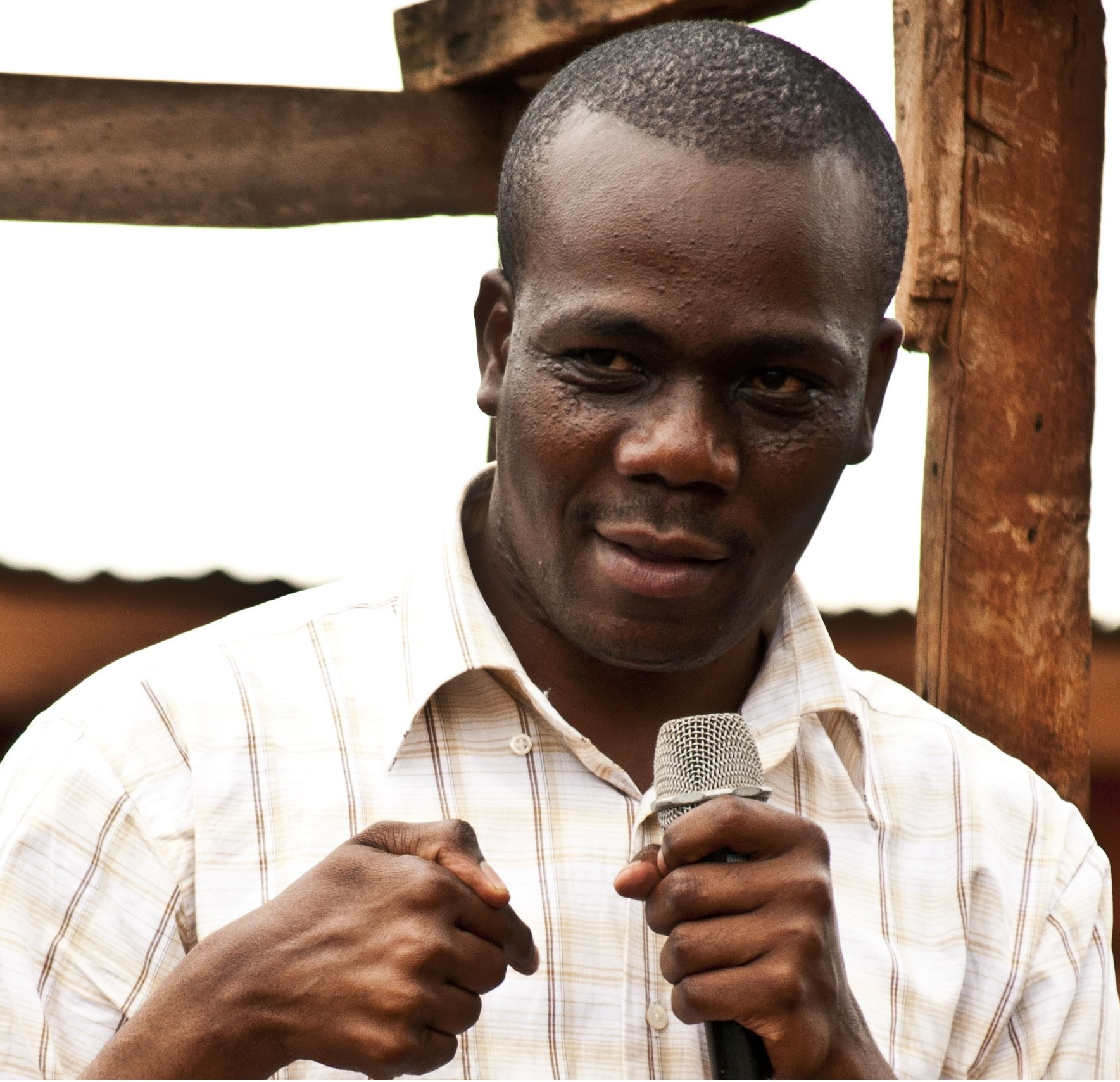
Zitto

#	Guest	Air Date
1	M2THEP	
2	Fareed Kubanda aka FidQ	
3	King Kikii	
4	Penny	
5	Hamisi Kigwangalla	
6	Aunt Ezekiel	
7	Amigo	
8	Chief Kiumbe	
9	Dudu Baya	
10	Ali Kiba	
11	Zitto Kabwe	
12	Joseph Msami	
13	Wagosi wa Kaya	

=== Season 10 ===
#	Guest	Air Date
1	Norah	
2	Evans Bukuku	
3	Gadna Habash	
4	Rebeca Gyumi	
5	Hermy B	
6	Dr Cheni	
7	Happiness Watimanywa	
8	Nay Wa Mitego	
9	Adam Juma	
10	Young Dee	
11	Maria Sarungi	
12	Shaa	
13	Paul Makonda	

=== Season 11 ===
#	Guest	Air Date
1	Humphrey Polepole	
2	Said Fella	
3	Alain Mulumba	
4	Wakazi	
5	Crazy GK	
6	Mwigulu Nchemba	
7	Tundu Lissu	
8	Ben Pol	
9	Mike Mushi	
10	Jerry Muro	
11	Meck Maxime	
12	Nathan Mpangala	
13	G-Nako	9 March 2015

== Awards and nominations ==
=== Tanzania People's Choice Awards ===
Year	Nominee / work	Award	Result
2014	Mkasi	Favorite TV show	Won
2015	Mkasi	Favorite TV show	Won
