= Yvonne Cherrie =

Tanzanian actress (born 1981)

- Born: Cherrie Y. K. Salehe; August 19, 1981 (age 45); Dar Es Salaam, Tanzania
- Other name: Monalisa
- Education: Tanzania Public Service College (Secretarial Studies); British Council Tanzania; Wilnag Media Training College (D.M.C)
- Occupations: Actress; film producer; film director; Radio Host
- Years active: 1998-present
- Spouse: George Tyson Akinyi (2001-2005)
- Children: Sonia Akinyi (2001); Sean Abdulwahid Jr. (2007); Kenzo Tyron (2016)
- Parent: Suzan Lewis (Natasha)
- Website: instagram.com/monalisatz

Yvonne Cherrie (also known as Monalisa, born August 19, 1981) is a Tanzanian actress. In 2010 she won Zanzibar International Film Festival for the 'Best Actress' award. She was also nominated for 2011 Nigeria Entertainment Awards for Pan African Actress Of The Year. She is cited as one of the best actresses and pioneers in the movie industry of Tanzania. She is also the founder of Act With Monalisa foundation which focus on to mentor and support young Tanzanian women with acting career guidance and a platform to showcase their talents and Director of African Women Arts and Film Festival (AWAFFEST).

== Early life and education ==
Cherrie was born on August 19, 1981, at Muhimbili, the national hospital of Tanzania. Her mother, Susan Lewis (Natasha Mamvi), is also an actress.

She had her early education at Luanda, Angola where her father was working; she later returned to Tanzania and started her primary education at Muungano Primary School in Temeke, Dar Es Salaam and she had secondary education at Zanaki Girls High School before heading to Tanzania Public Service College where she studied secretarial studies.

In 2002 she joined British Council Tanzania for Pre Advance level to study English language course, and after that she joined Wilnag Media Training College in Nairobi where she graduated with a diploma in mass communication.

== Career ==
She got her nickname “Monalisa” from her 1998 performance as a young lady, struggling to reconcile her life with her multiple lovers, in the series Mambo Hayo. In 2002 Monalisa made her first feature film debut in the film called Girlfriend where she played as Tumpale, TID'S girlfriend, who is forced to turn her life around after being kicked out by her dad. She then played roles in many movies, such as Sabrina (2003), Dilemma (2004), She Is My Sister (2006), Kwa Heshima Ya Penzi, Binti Nusa and Network. One of her notable performances is from Black Sunday that earned her the 'Best Actress' award for the 2010 Zanzibar International Film Festival and nomination for Pan African Actress of The year 2011 Nigeria Entertainment Awards.

== Filmography ==
=== TV series ===
Year	Name	Role	Note
1998	Mambo Hayo	Monalisa	Television: Independent Television Tanzania (ITV). Cast:Jacob Steven(Jb), Single Mtambalike (Richie), Bishanga, Waridi and Cathy
2013-2015	Siri Ya Mtungi	Lulu	Produced by Media for Development International. Television: East Africa Television (EATV) and TV 1
2014-2015	Tanzania Movie Talents	Judge	Acting Competition aired on ITV
2021	Sinia	Rosemary Venus	Aired on Maisha Magic Bongo (Dstv Channel)

=== Stage Plays ===
Year	Name	Note
2000-2001	The Government Inspector	Bagamoyo Arts and Culture Festival
2002	Zawadi Ya Ushindi	Zanzibar International Film Festival
2003	The Song Of Lawino	Little Theatre (Tanzania)
2003	Don't Dress For Dinner	Russian Cultural Centre (Tanzania)
2003	Kiu	Kenya National Theatre
2003	A Man of the people	Kenya National Theatre

=== Film ===
Year	Name	Role	Note
2002	Girlfriend	Tumpale	Cast: TID, AY, Crazy Gk and Nina
2003	Sabrina	Sabrina	
2004	Dilemma		
2006	She Is My Sister	Rose	With Steven Kanumba Mercy Johnson, Nkiru Sylvanus.
2007	Kwa Heshima Ya Penzi	Miranda	With Jacob Steven and Single Mtambalike
2007	Chanzo Ni Mama		Cast :Deogratiua Shija, Suzan Lewis
2008	Binti Nusa part 1	Malaika	With Suzan Lewis, Hashimu Kambi
2008	Kaburi Moja		with Hemedi Suleiman
2008	Behind The Scenes	Carey	With Vincent Kigosi, Blandina Chagula, Suzan Lewis
2009	Jeraha La Ndoa	Rehema	With Haji Adam, Bakari Makuka
2009	Wrong Number		With Riyama Ally, Hemedi Suleiman, Gadner Habash
2009	Cellular		With Thea, Sajuki
2010	Binti Nusa 2& 3	Malaika	with Suzan Lewis, Elizabeth Chijumba, Hashim Kambi
2010	Black Sunday	Sharon	with Steven Kanumba, Aunty Ezekiel, Yusuph Mlela
2010	Payback	Rebecca	With Steven Kanumba and Yusuph Mlela
2010	Maza House		With Suzan Lewis, Deogratius Shida
2011	38 Weeks		With Haji Salum (Mboto)
2011	Pastor Myamba, The trial	Sarah	With Emmanuel Myamba.
2012	Tell Me The Truth		
2012	Chai Moto		Jeniffer Mgendi, Mussa Banzi, Christina Matai & Juma Mtima
2012	Uyoga		With Single Mtambalike
2012	Ujinga Wangu	Ritha	With Hemedi Suleiman and Haji Salum (Mboto)
2013	Dakika Ya Mwisho		With Niva
2013	Five Girls		With Grace Mapunda and Hashimu Kambi.
2013	In Between		With Suzan Lewis, Haji Salum (Mboto)
2013	Sistahili Kusamehewa		With Patcho Mwamba, Alex Wasponga, Suleiman Barafu, Mohamed Fungafunga
2013	Mwisho Wa Siku		With Lucy Komba, Victor Mwikala, Jennifer Kakolaki
2013	Hidden Treasure		With Bad Boy, Mohammed Yondo
2013	Daladala		Casts: Suleiman Barafu, Amri Athuman (King Majuto)
2014	Damian	Monalisa	Casts: Hashim Kambi (Dr.ambi), Jemedari Gwatwambilileghe (Damian)
2014	Bana Congo		With Haji Salum (Mboto)
2014	Network	Detective Elizabeth	With Brian Ibrick, Simon Mwakafamba, Shikunzi Haonga, Charles Rom
2015	Umuhimu Wako		With Rose Ndauka, Suzan Lewis, Raheem
2016	Daddy's Wedding	Mary	With Sandra Temu, Banana Zoro, Raheem
2019	Leo	Cat	With Ally Juma Ally, Single Mtambalike

== Awards and nominations ==
Year	Event	Prize	Recipient	Result
2008	Kiu Media Awards	Queen Of Bongo Movies	Herself	Won
2010	Zanzibar International Film Festival	Best Actress	Black Sunday	Won
2010	Filamu Central Best Of 2010	Best Actress	Binti Nusa	Won
2011	2011 Nigeria Entertainment Awards	Pan African Actress Of The Year	Black Sunday	Nominated
2015	Tanzania Film Awards	Best Actress In A Leading Role	Daddy's Wedding	Nominated
2015	Tanzania Film Awards	Tribute Award(Media)	Filamonata (With Suzan Lewis)	Nominated
2018	The African Prestigious Awards (Ghana)	Best Female Movie Star	Herself	Won
