= Wolper =

Wolper is a surname. Notable people with the surname include:

- David L. Wolper (1928–2010), American television and film producer
- Jacqueline Wolper, Tanzanian actress and fashion stylist
- Pierre Wolper, Belgian computer scientist

== Characters ==
- Faith Wolper, psychiatrist from Season 4 of Nip/Tuck
- Mark Wolper, waiter from Sunset Beach
