= TPSC =

TPSC may refer to:

- Turning point School & college
- Tanzania Public Service College
- Toronto Public Space Committee
- Tpsc, a subgroup in terpene synthase N terminal domain
