= Mohamed Fungafunga =

Tanzanian actor

- Born: Mohamed Fungafunga
- Died: December 15, 2020; Mkuranga, Pwani Region, Tanzania
- Resting place: The Mburahati Cemetery, Dar es Salaam
- Other names: Mzee Jengua; Jengua
- Occupations: Actor; comedian
- Years active: ??–2020

Mohamed Fungafunga known by the stage names Jengua and Mzee Jengua was a veteran Tanzanian actor and comedian who appeared in more than one hundred films and television shows in a career that spanned more than 15 years.

== Career ==
Fungafunga's fame began in the early 2000s when he was cast in a drama series organized by the 'Chemchemu Arts Group' in the drama he acted as a parent who does not value his daughters and refuses to send them to school, while he has a relationship with the students. Fungafunga gained popularity due to his brutal character and his desire to date young girls. In 2013, he appeared in the award-winning film, Foolish Age featuring Elizabeth Michael. He also collaborated with Mzee Majuto in the Siri ya Marehemu franchise of films.

== Death ==
Fungafunga died on December 15, 2020, at Mkuranga in the Pwani Region after long struggle with stroke. Fungafunga was buried on Wednesday December 16, 2020 in the afternoon at the Mburahati Cemetery in Dar es Salaam.
