= Grace Mapunda =

Tanzanian actress

- Born: July 5, 1969; Mwanza, Tanzania
- Died: November 2, 2024 (aged 55); Mwananyamala Regional Referral Hospital, Dar es Salaam
- Resting place: Kinondoni Cemetery
- Other names: Tessa; Mama Kawele
- Occupation: Actress
- Years active: 1990s – 2024
- Children: 2

Grace Vincent Mapunda (July 5, 1969 – November 2, 2024) was a Tanzanian actress known for playing Tesa in Huba series.

== Biography ==
Grace Mapunda was born on July 5, 1969, in Mwanza. She completed her education in Dar es Salaam and later earned a degree in Theatre Arts from the University of Dar es Salaam.

Mapunda began her acting career in the early 1990s and was among the early members of the Kaole group where she got her nickname Mama Kawele. She appeared in various television series and films, including the series Huba, in which she portrayed the character Tesa. Mapunda was married and had two daughters, Happiness and Ritha.

== Filmography ==
=== Movies ===
Year	Movie	Role	Notes/Cast
2008	Yellow Banana	Mrs. Bihemo	with Nargus Mohamed, Vincent Kigosi and Blandina Chagula
2009	Fake Smile	Grace Sr.	
2009	The Hero of The Church	Mrs. Maziku	with Steven Kanumba, Juma Kilowoko, Mzee Chillo, Charles Magari and Cloud 112
2010	Offside	Flora	with Irene Uwoya, Vincent Kigosi, Jacob Steven and Steven Kanumba.
2010	Bed Rest	Additional role	with Ndubagwe Misayo, Ruth Suka, Vincent Kigosi and Blandina Chagula
2011	Because of You		
2013	Love & Power		with Irene Paul and Patcho Mwamba and Steven Kanumba
2013	Matilda	Mathias's mother	
2013	Nifute Machozi		
2014	Jicho Langu		with Salim Ahmed, Jennifer Kyaka and Tadeo Alexander
2014	Hard Price		with Sabrina Tamim, Vincent Kigosi and Jacqueline Wolper
2014	Kichupa		
2016	Chun'tama		with Suleiman Barafu, Chuchu Hans, Hashim Kambi, Daudi Michael

=== TV Show ===
Year	Show/series	Role	Notes/Cast
Since 2017	Huba	Tesa	with Tito Zimbwe, Nandy, Aunt Ezekiel, Riyama Ally, Muhogo Mchungu, Fatuma Makongoro, Mboto Haji, Abdul Ahmed.
Since 2019	Nyavu	Shani	

== Death ==
Grace died on November 2, 2024, at Mwananyamala Hospital in Dar es Salaam. She had been hospitalized for breathing complications two days prior (October 31, 2024) and was in the intensive care unit when she died.

=== Reactions ===
Tributes and honor from Tanzanian film industry including fellow actors, friends government and fans expressed their condolences reflecting on her legacy in Tanzanian cinema.
