= Hafizu Bello =

Nigerian film producer

- Born: Hafizu Bello; 5 April 1974 (age 52); Kano, Nigeria
- Education: St Thomas Secondary School, Kano; Met Film School, London
- Occupations: Director; Scriptwritter
- Years active: 1999 – present
- Known for: Director
- Height: 6.7
- Title: Sir
- Spouse: Intisar Yusuf Uba
- Children: Maryam, Fatima, Yusuf
- Awards: See below

Hafizu Bello (born 5 April 1974) is a Nigerian film director. He is a major pioneering member of the Kannywood film industry.

== Career ==
Bello joined the Kannywood film industry in 1999, primarily as a director. He gained recognition in the industry after directing Muƙaddari in 2000, for which he received best film at the Arewa Film Award. This was followed by Ruhi in 2003, Yanayi in 2004, and Qarni in 2005. He was acknowledged by the 2013 Africa Magic Viewers' Choice Awards for Best Hausa Film for Faida in 2013, and subsequently won the 2015 Africa Magic Viewers' Choice Awards in the best indigenous language category (Hausa).

== Awards ==
Year	Award	Category	Film	Result
2013	2013 Africa Magic Viewers' Choice Awards	Best Director	Faida	Won
2014	2014 Africa Magic Viewers' Choice Awards	Best film	Bikin Kishi	Nominated
2015	2015 Africa Magic Viewers Choice Awards	Best Producer	Binkice	Won
2016	2016 Africa Magic Viewers' Choice Awards	Best Film	Sakaina	Nominated
2018	City People Entertainment Awards	Best Director	Uwar Bari	Won
2022	2022 Africa Magic Viewers' Choice Awards	Best Producer		Nominated
2023	2023 Africa Magic Viewers' Choice Awards	Best Producer		Nominated

== Filmography ==
Title	Year
Mukaddari	2000
Ruhi	2003
Yanayi	2004
Qarni	2005
Dan mazari	2007
Sammatsi	2008
Faida	2013
Hakki	2018
Hikima	2021
Uwar Bari	2022
Aisha	2023
