= Elizabeth Michael =

Tanzanian actress

Elizabeth Michael (Lulu)
- Born: Diana Elizabeth Michael Kimemeta; April 16, 1995 (age 31); Dar Es Salaam, Tanzania
- Other name: Lulu
- Education: Tanzania Public Service College (DHRM)
- Occupations: actress; movie producer
- Years active: 2000–present
- Spouse: Francis Ciza (Majizzo) (m.2021)
- Children: 2
- Website: instagram.com/elizabethmichaelofficial

Elizabeth Michael (Lulu) (born April 16, 1995) is a Tanzanian actress.

In 2013, she won the Zanzibar International Film Festival award for Best Actress for "Woman Of Principles". She also won 2016 Africa Magic Viewers Choice Awards for Best Movie Eastern Africa. In August 2017, Africa Youth Awards named her among the 100 Most Influential Young Africans. In November 2017, she was convicted of involuntary manslaughter for the 2012 death of Steven Kanumba and sentenced to two years in prison. On April 26, 2018, on Tanzanian Union celebration, she was among of the prisoners who were pardoned by President John Pombe Magufuli where her sentence was reduced. She was later released on May 9, 2018, after serving six months in prison to do community services for the remaining time after showing good behavior while she was in prison. On 12 November 2018 she completed her probation.

== Early life and education ==
Michael was born and raised in Dar Es Salaam, Tanzania. Her father is Michael Kimemeta, and her mother is Lucrecia Kalugira. She attended Remnant Academy for her primary education, and Perfect Vision High School, St Mary's High School for her secondary education. She then joined Tanzania Public Service College where she obtained her diploma in Human Resource Management.

== Career ==
=== Acting career ===
Michael started her acting career as a child actor when she was only five years old. Actor Mahsein Awadh (Dr Cheni) was the one who discovered her during his talent search. He took her to Kaole Sanaa Group, where she appeared in many television soap operas where she first appeared in Dira where she played Nemu, she appeared in other soap operas including Zizimo, Baragumu, Gharika, Taswira, and Demokrasia that were well known during the 2000s. She performed under the name Lulu, a name under which she is commonly known today. In 2005, she made her film debut in the action film called Misukosuko.

Michael has participated in many big projects such as Wahapahapa Radio Drama of 2009 that was produced by Media for Development International Tanzania. She played Mainda in the story that tells the importance of parent-child communication in protecting youth as they navigate through the difficult period of adolescence. The project was directed by Jordan Riber from MFDI. Her subsequent movies include Family Tears, Ripple of Tears, Oxygen, House Boy, and Woman Of Principles. She has appeared in more than 30 films.

In August 2013, she launched the movie Foolish Age, which was her first effort as a producer. The event took place at Mlimani City Conference Hall in Dar Es Salaam, Tanzania. The movie was screened at the 2014 Zanzibar International Film Festival, Foolish Age was nominated as Favourite Movie at the 2014 Tanzania People's Choice Awards (Tuzo Za Watu) and Michael won Favourite Actress for her performance in the film.

In 2015, she released her second movie as producer called Mapenzi Ya Mungu (God's love) which she also played as a leading character . The movie was screened at the 2015 Zanzibar International Film Festival and the movie won the 2016 Africa Magic Viewers Choice Awards as the Best Movie Eastern Africa.

In July 2016, she launched her another movie called Ni Noma which she produced and starred as a leading character . The movie was sold via a mobile app called ProinBox.

== Personal life ==
In October 2018, Michael became engaged to Francis Ciza (Dj Majizzo) the owner of EFM Radio and TVE. The couple got married on 17 February 2021. In July 2021, they had a son named Genesis. In Dec 2022 they had a daughter named Gracious.

== Brand associations, endorsements and ambassadorship ==
- In 2013, Michael was selected as official ambassador for Dar Es Salaam Film Festival DFF in Dar Es Salaam. Her film, Foolish Age, was also screened at that festival.
- In February 2014, she signed with Airtel Tanzania to be the host of the TV show Airtel Yatosha TV Show.
- In 2015, she signed a brand ambassadorship deal with Paisha Tanzania to be the brand ambassador of the mobile app Paisha that deals with online business.
- In 2016, she was named by Hengan Baby Products and Sanitary Co. Ltd. (Tanzania) to be the ambassador of Freestyle pads (napkins).
- In October 2017 she was named by Azam Media Tanzania through their channel of cinemas, Sinema Zetu, to be the official ambassador of the Sinema Zetu International Film Festival (SZIFF).
- In March 2019 she was the official host of Sinema Zetu International Film Festival (SZIFF2019)
- In February 2020 she signed a contract with Multichoice Tanzania to become a brand ambassador of Dstv
- In 2020 she signed a contract with Azania Company Ltd to become a brand ambassador of Azania Flour
- From 2020 to 2021 she was a brand ambassador of Tecno Mobile in Tanzania

== Manslaughter conviction, pardoning, and probation ==
On 13 November 2017, Michael was convicted in High Court of Tanzania for involuntary manslaughter and sentenced to two years in prison for the 2012 death of actor Steven Kanumba, whom she had been dating when she was a juvenile (17 years old).

Michael was alleged to have caused the death of 28-year old Kanumba. The death was said to have occurred after Kanumba confronted Michael for talking to another man in front of him. Michael was arrested and stayed in remand for almost a year for investigation. Later, the charges were amended to involuntary manslaughter. Member of Parliament Halima Mdee arranged for lawyers Peter Kibatala and Kennedy Fungamtama to represent Michael, because she believed she was innocent. In January 2013 Michael was granted bail.

In October 2017, Michael testified to the High Court that after Kanumba confronted her for talking to another man, he took her to his room by force and starting beating her with a sword while he was intoxicated. She admitted during her testimony that she was the last person to be with Kanumba, and claimed that Kanumba began breathing fast and collapsed while beating her, hitting his head. She said after Kanumba fell down she used the opportunity to escape, unaware that he had died. She left the area and was later arrested without knowing what she was being arrested for. She said she found out the second day after her arrest by Oysterbay Police in Dar Es Salaam. The officers that arrested Michael found that she had injuries consistent with sword wounds as they were arresting her. A postmortem report from Muhimbili National Hospital of Tanzania concluded that Kanumba's death was caused by brain concussion as the result of difficulty in breathing in conjunction with excessive drinking.

On April 26, 2018, Michael was among the prisoners who were pardoned by President John Pombe Magufuli whereby she was deducted 1/4 of her imprisonment. In May 2018 she was released from the prison by the High Court of Tanzania under the Tanzania Community Services Act of 2002, and the remaining time by doing community services after showing good behavior when she was in prison. On November 12, 2018, she completed her probation.

== Humanitarian work ==
On January 23, 2019, Michael started the campaign called “Save My Valentine” which aimed to raise money for helping people with special needs. Through the campaign Michael sold part of her clothes so as to collect a certain amount of money, she sold her 62 clothes and the money obtained were taken to some of the orphanage centers in Iringa Tanzania during the Valentine’s Day

== Filmography ==
=== Television ===
Year	Name	Role	Note
2000	Dira	Nemu	Aired on Independent Television Tanzania (ITV Tanzania).
2001-2006	Zizimo	Lulu	Aired on Independent Television Tanzania (ITV Tanzania).
2001-2006	Taswira	Lulu	Aired on Independent Television Tanzania (ITV Tanzania).
2001-2006	Baragumu	Lulu	Aired on Independent Television Tanzania (ITV Tanzania).
2001-2006	Gharika	Lulu	Aired on Independent Television Tanzania (ITV Tanzania).
2001-2006	Sayari	Lulu	Aired on Independent Television Tanzania (ITV Tanzania).
2001-2006	Tufani	Lulu	Aired on Independent Television Tanzania (ITV Tanzania).
2001-2006	Tetemo	Lulu	Aired on Independent Television Tanzania (ITV Tanzania).
2001-2006	Jahazi	Lulu	Aired on Independent Television Tanzania (ITV Tanzania).
2001-2006	Demokrasia	Lulu	Aired on Tanzania Broadcasting Corporation (TBC).
2006–2010	Watoto Wetu	Host	Children's program aired on Independent Television Tanzania (ITV Tanzania)
2014–2015	Tanzania Movie Talents (TMT)	Host	Acting competition aired on Independent Television Tanzania (ITV Tanzania)
Jan 2018-2020	Sarafu	Jackline Sanga "Jacky"	Aired on Maisha Magic Bongo (Dstv Channel).
2021	Mimi	Naomi	Also Producer
2024	Online	Yvone	Web Series
2024	CRDB’s Zogo Mchongo	Herself/Host	CRDB Tv Program
2024 to present	Jua Kali	Maria	Aired on Maisha Magic Bongo Dstv Channel

=== Radio drama series ===
Year	Film	Role	Notes
2009	Wahapahapa	Mainda	Aired on Radio One Tanzania and Radio Free Africa

=== Movies ===
Year	Film	Role	Notes/Cast
2005	Misukosuko Part 2	Catherine	With Jimmy Mponda, Seba and Salama Salmin (Sandrah)
2006	Wema	Betty	With Senga
2007	Silent Killer		With Mohamed Nurdin (Chekibudi), Shumileta
2008	Family Tears	Lindah	With Steven Kanumba, Wema Sepetu, Jacqueline Wolper and Richard Bezendhout
2008	Mtoto wa Nyoka		
2008	Lost Twins	Anita (young)	With Steven Kanumba, Hashimu Kambi, Suzan Lewis.
2009	Taste of Love	Martha	With Aunty Ezekiel, Blandina Chagula, Mahsein Awadh.
2009	Ripple of Tears	Lizy/Smiles	With Steven Kanumba
2009	Passion		With Jacqueline Wolper, Irene Uwoya, Yusuph Mlela, Hashim Kambi
2009	Unfortunate Love		With Steven Kanumba, Lisa Jensen, Zamda
2009	Too Late		With Mahsein Awadh (Dr Cheni), Tumaini Bigirimana (Fifi), Issa Mussa
2009	Reason To Die	Nyina	With Mahsein Awadh (Dr Cheni)
2010	Family Disaster	Julieth	With Vincent Kigosi, Diana Kimaro
2010	Crazy Love	Student	With Steven Kanumba, Shamsa Ford, Hemed Suleiman
2010	Magic House	Dorah	with Steven Kanumba, Nargis Mohamed
2010	My dreams	Jane	With Vincent Kigosi, Irene Uwoya, Shamsa Ford, Mahsein Awadh
2011	Birthday Party		With Salma Jabu (Nisha)
2011	Ritazo	Ritazo	With Riyama Ally
2011	Tattoo	Bridget	
2011	Confusion	Besta	With Diana Kimario, Hemedi Suleiman
2012	House Boy	Lulu	With Wema Sepetu, Kajala Masanja and Mr Blue
2012	Woman Of Principles	Linah	With Vincent Kigosi and Nargis Mohamed
2012	Dangerous Girl	Hidaya	
2012	Mtoto wa Mbwa	Nice	With Simon Mwakapagata (Rado)
2012	Yatima Asiyestahili	Njwele	With Nice Mohamed and Jeniffer Kyaka
2012	Oxygen		With Sydney, Hashim Kambi, Grace Mapunda
2013	Foolish Age	Loveness	Also Executive Producer With Diana Kimaro and Hashimu Kambi
2014	Family Curse		With Hashimu Kambi, Yusuph Mlela, Cathy Rupia
2015	Mapenzi Ya Mungu	Shikana	Also Producer With Flora Mtegoa, Linah Sanga
2016	Ni Noma	Angela	Also Producer With Kulwa Kikumba and Isarito Mwakalikamo

== Awards and nominations ==
Year	Event	Prize	Recipient	Result
2013	Zanzibar International Film Festival	Best Actress	Woman Of Principles	Won
2014	Tanzania People's Choice Awards (Tuzo za watu)	Favourite Actress	Foolish Age	Won
2014	Tanzania People's Choice Awards (Tuzo za watu)	Favourite Movie	Foolish Age	Nominated
2016	2016 Africa Magic Viewers Choice Awards	Best Movie Eastern Africa	Mapenzi Ya Mungu	Won
2016	Africa Entertainment Legend Awards (Nigeria)	Best Actress	Herself	Nominated
2016	Swahili Fashion Week Awards	Style Icon Of The Year	Herself	Won
2019	African Leading Women Awards (Nigeria)	Exceptional Actress of The Year	Herself	Won
