= 2016 Africa Magic Viewers' Choice Awards =

2016 Africa Magic Viewers Choice Awards

4th Africa Magic Viewers Choice Awards
- Date: 5 March 2016
- Site: Eko Hotels and Suites, Victoria Island, Lagos, Lagos State, Nigeria
- Organized by: Multichoice Africa

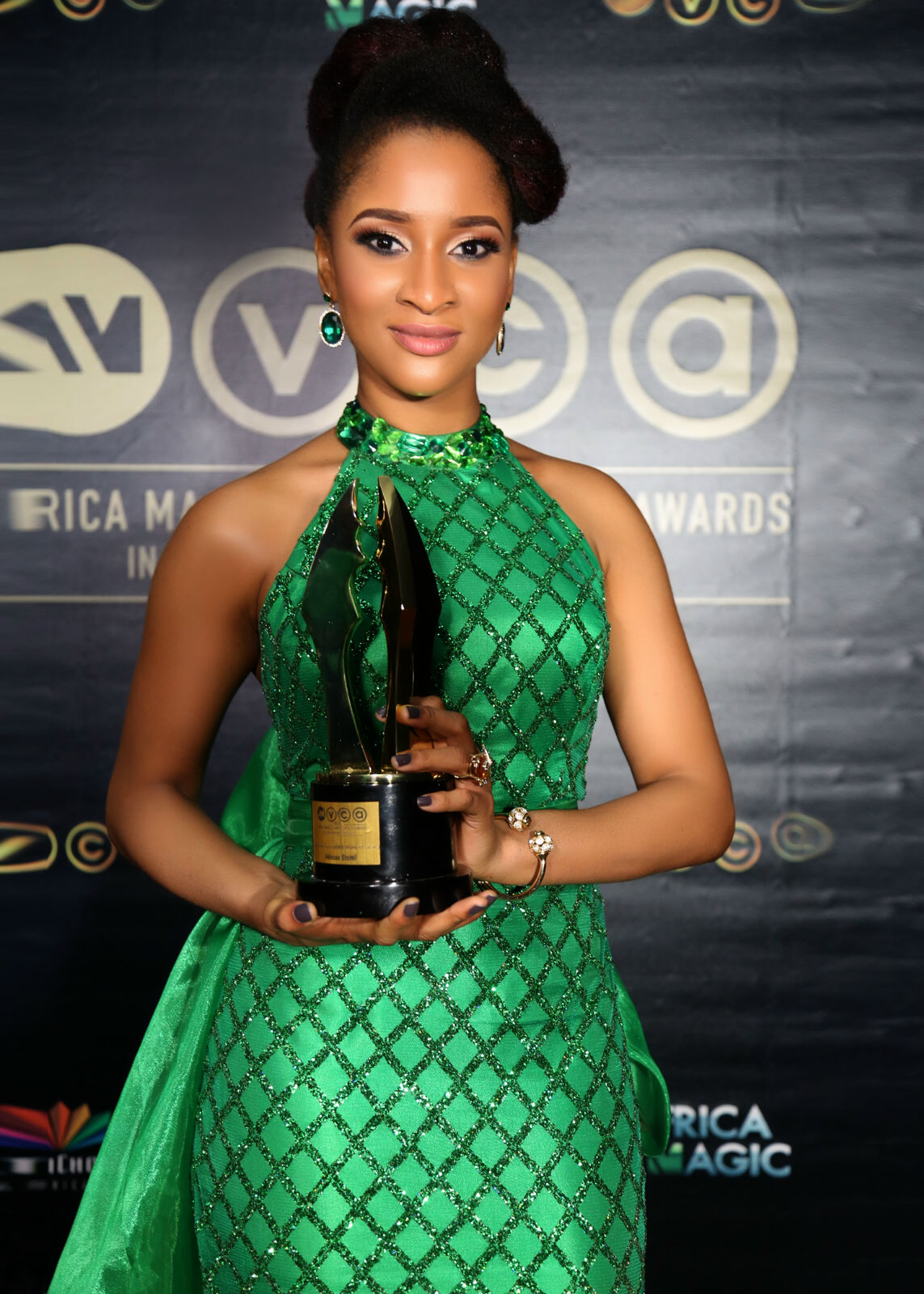
Adesua Etomi-Wellington at the 2016 Africa Magic Viewers Choice Awards where she won the Best Actress In A Drama award

The 2016 Africa Magic Viewers Choice Awards (AMVCA) was held on March 5, 2016 at the Eko Hotels and Suites in Victoria Island, Lagos, Nigeria. It was hosted by Ikponmwosa Osakioduwa and Minnie Dlamini.

Nominees were revealed on December 11, 2015 by Kenyan journalist Larry Madowo and Nigerian comedian Chigurl.

== Winners and nominees ==
Best Actor in a Drama	Best Actress in a Drama
Daniel K Daniel (A Soldier's Story); Majid Michel (Being Mrs Elliot); Van Vicker (A Long Night); Segun Arinze (Jaja the Great); Blossom Chukwujekwu (Falling)	Adesua Etomi (Falling); Genevieve Nnaji (Road to Yesterday); Mary Lazarus (Don’t Cry for Me); Belinda Effah (Stop); Fulu Mugovhani (Ayanda); Nse Ikpe-Etim (The Visit)
Best Supporting Actress in a Drama	Best Supporting Actor in a Drama
Tunbosun Aiyedehin (Before 30); Beverly Naya (Before 30); Zubaidat Ibrahim Fagge (Dry); Lepacious Bose (The Green Necklace)	Sambassa Nzeribe (A Soldier’s Story); Blossom Chukwujekwu (Stolen Water); Soibifaa Dokubo (Stigma); Olumide Oworu (A Soldier’s Story); OC Ukeje (The Department)
Best Movie (West Africa)	Best Actor in a Comedy
Chinny Onwugbenu, Genevieve Nnaji & Chichi Nwoko (Road to Yesterday (film)); Stephanie Linus (Dry); Dagogo Diminas (Stigma); Biodun Stephen (The Visit); Frank Rajah Arase (The Refugees); Juliet Asante (Silver Rain (film)); Stanlee Ohikhuare (Common Man)	Folarin Falana (Jenifa's Diary); IK Ogbonna (Stop); Bishop Imeh Umoh (Caught in the Act); Bowoto Jephthah (Head Gone); Kelechi Udegbe (Officer Titus)
Best Actress in a Comedy	Best Make-up Artist
Funke Akindele (Jenifa's Diary); Lepacious Bose (Being Mrs Elliot); Abimbola Craig (Skinny Girl in Transit); Nana Mensah (An African City); Ini Edo (Desperate Housegirls)	Louiza Calore (Ayanda); Gabriel Okorie (Dry); Innocent Abba (Jaja the Great); Funke Olowu (Ojuju); Moses Ogunlana (Being Mrs Elliot)
Best Lighting Designer	Best Costume Designer
Stanlee Ohikhuare (Common Man); Stanlee Ohikhuare (Kpians: The Feast of Souls); Francis Lubanjuma (House Arrest); David Wyte and Paul Gambit (Gbomo Gbomo Express); Oluwole Olawoyin (Being Mrs Elliot)	Uche Nancy (Dry); Patrick Asante (Silver Rain (film)); Byge Oru (Being Mrs Elliot); Tomi Adeoye (The First Lady); Angel Nwakibie (Cougars); Ejiro Amos Tafiri/Vanessa Otarva (Oracles Online)
Best Movie Director	Best Picture Editor
Akin Omotoso (Tell Me Sweet Something); Ishaya Bako (Road to Yesterday (film)); Stephanie Linus (Dry); Sara Blecher (Ayanda); Walter 'Waltbanger' Taylaur (Gbomo Gbomo Express); Shirley Frimpong-Manso (Rebecca)	Shirley Frimpong-Manso (Rebecca); Vuyani Sondlo (Tell Me Sweet Something); Chuka Ejorh (Road to Yesterday (film)); Frankie Ogar (A Soldier's Story); Adeyemi Olowoshagba (Special Crimes Unit: Lasgidi Cops)
Best Sound Editor	Best Art Director
Marquex Jose Guillermo (Dry); Guy Steer (Ayanda); Kulanen Ikyo (Road to Yesterday (film)); Bernie Anti (Candle in the Wind); Maurice Kings (Bambitious); Gavin McCullough (Tell Me Sweet Something)	Frank Rajah Arase (The Refugees); Dagogo Diminas (Stigma); Gabriel Okorie (Dry); Stanlee Ohikhuare (Common Man); Patrick 'koinage' Nnamani (Elephant in the Room)
Best Cinematographer	Best Writer
Paul Michaelson (Tell Me Sweet Something); Jonathan Kovel (Ayanda); Tolu LordTanner (Couple of Days); Okey Oku and Robert Peters (The Refugees); Angel Barroeta (Dry); Stanlee Ohikhuare (Common Man)	Trish Malone (Ayanda); Melissa Leilani Larson (Freetown); Afe Olumoye (Anniversary); Emil B. Garuba (Road to Yesterday (film)); Blessing Egbe (Iquo's Journal)
Best Short Film/Online video	Best Indigenous Language (Hausa)
Oluseyi Amuwa (A Day with Death); Bongiwe Selane (Panic Button); Kassim Braimah (Yawa); Folasakin Iwajomo (Blood Taxi); Bongiwe Selane (A Cup of Sugar)	Salisu Balarabe (Dadin Kowa); Bashir Abdullahi (Sarki Jatau); Najjashi SB Jakara (Inji Yan' Ca Ca); Abubakar mai Shadda and Hafizu Bello (Sakaina); Nuhu Abdullahi (Baya Da Kura); Salisu Balarabe (Dadin Kowa)
Best Indigenous Language (Yoruba)	Best Indigenous Language (Igbo)
Abiodun Jimoh and Jumoke Odetola (Binta Ofege); Don Omope (Taxi Driver: Oko Ashewo); Mercy Aigbe (Victims); Bukunmi Oluwasina (Ayomi); Kazim Adeoti (Shadow)	Paul Igwe (Usekwu Igbo); Charles Novia (Nduka); Onyekachukwu Okeke (Udo Gba koi koi); Ubaka Joseph Ugochukwu (The Missing God); Chigozie Atuanya (Chetanna)
Best Indigenous Language (Swahili)	Best Documentary
Single Mtambalike (Kitendawili); Neema Ndanu Kilon (Semu); Caroline Mbaturia (Fihi); Amil Shivji (Samaki Mchangani); Damaris Irungu-Ochieng (Myumba 10)	Remi Vaughan-Richards (Faaji Agba); Kagho Crowther Idhebor (The New Africa); Nneka Isaac-Moses (Goge Africa encounters Wild Gorilla); Dotun Akande (Demystifying Autism); Nanmet Anthony (Dawn to Dusk)
Best Television Series Comedy/Drama	Best Overall Movie
Ariyike Oladipo (Daddy's Girls); Dorothy Ghettuba (Jane and Abel); Erica Sugo Anyadike (How to Find a Husband); Gerald Langiri (Santalal); Olabisi Jinadu (Officer Titus)	Stephanie Linus (Dry); Adam Abel and Garrett Batty (Freetown); Sara Blecher (Ayanda); Akin Omotoso (Tell Me Sweet Something); Ishaya Bako (Road to Yesterday); Juliet Asante (Silver Rain (film)); Joseph Kenneth Ssebaggala (House Arrest)
Best Movie (Eastern Africa)	Best Movie (Southern Africa)
Elizabeth Michael (Mapenzi Ya Mungu); Joseph Kenneth Ssebaggla (House Arrest); Joseph Kenneth Ssebaggala (Call 112); Single Mtambalike(Kitendawili); Stanford Kihore (Mpango Mbaya); Honeymoon Aljabri (Daddy's Wedding)	Joyce Mhango Chavula (Lilongwe); Akin Omotoso (Tell Me Sweet Something); Sara Blecher (Ayanda)
TrailBlazer Award	Industry Merit Award
Kemi Lala Akindoju	Bukky Ajayi; Sadiq Daba
