= Media for Development International =

American non-profit company

Media For Development International
- Type: Private
- Industry: Film and television production
- Founded: 1989
- Founder: Steve Smith
- Headquarters: United States,
- Key people: Dr. Ayo Ajayi (Addis Ababa Ethiopia); Paul Myers (Chicago); John Riber (Dar es Salaam, Tanzania); Steve Smith (Paonia); CO Khun Mechai Viravaidya (Bangkok, Thailand); Batilloi Warritay (Freetown, Sierra Leone)
- Website: www.mfditanzania.com

Media for Development International is an American 501(c)(3) non-profit company founded in 1989. MFDI produces and distributes dramatic African social-message films ("Edutainment" or "Entereducate") for African audiences on issues such as AIDS, teenage sexuality, teenage pregnancy, women's issues and general health. Much of MFDI's best known work was done in Zimbabwe between the years of 1990 and 2000, including films such as Neria (1991) and Yellow Card (2000). Branch offices are in Tanzania and Zimbabwe.

== Chumo ==
Chumo, MFDI's latest film production is a dramatic film made in Tanzania that addresses malaria and pregnancy through the romantic story of a fishing village. It stars Jokate Mwegelo, Yusuph Mlela, Ahmed Olotu and Sharo Millionaire

"Chumo" was directed by Jordan Riber for the CCP-led Communication and Malaria Initiative in Tanzania (COMMIT), a USAID and PMI-funded project that is working to promote positive behavior around malaria control and prevention.

- Chumo wins Zanzibar International Film Festival

Chumo director, Jordan Riber, took the ZIFF Award for Best Director and Jokate Mwegelo, who plays Amina in the film, won the award for Best Actress

- Zanzibar International Film Festival: Official Selection

Chumo has been selected for the Zanzibar International Film Festival (ZIFF) in Zanzibar, Tanzania. The festival will take part from the 18th - 26 June 2011.

- Chumo wins Grand Prize at the Northwest Projections Film Festival

Chumo has won the grand prize at the Northwest Projections Film Festival in Bellingham, Washington, taking home the coveted Golden Hamster Award.

- Northwest Projections Film Festival: Official Selection

Jordan Riber's film Chumo (Bride's Price), along with his feature-length documentary, Mwamba Ngoma, have both been selected at the Northwest Projections Film Festival in Bellingham, Washington. Chumo has been accepted under the Narrative Shorts category, while Mwamba Ngoma falls under the Feature Films category

- Pan African Film Festival: Official Selection

Chumo (Bride's Price) has been selected at the Pan African Film Festival (PAFF) in Los Angeles, California under the Short Narrative genre. This will be the official United States premier of Chumo. The film will be screened on Friday, February 18 at 6:30pm and Sunday, February 20 at 12:30pm.

- 2012 Nigeria Entertainment Awards Pan African Actress of the year (Jokate Mwegelo) - nominated
- 9th Africa Movie Academy Awards Best Short film - nominated

== The Wahapahapa Serial Drama (2007–2010) ==
The Wahapahapa serial drama is a 156 episode weekly radio soap opera produced by MFDI in association with Johns Hopkins University Center for Communication Programs, with support from the Tanzanian Ministry of Health and Social Welfare and the United States Agency for International Development through the US President’s Emergency Fund for AIDS Relief.

The story follows the formation and struggles of a music group from a fictitious town in the heart of Tanzania, and addresses HIV prevention and treatment.

The project involved contemporary musicians from Tanzania such as Lady Jaydee, Banana Zoro, Enika and others together with Tanzanian actress Elizabeth Michael and was directed by Jordan Riber and others.

The Wahapahapa radio drama takes place in Kalumbi, a fictional town somewhere in the heart of Tanzania. Wahapahapa’s main characters are a group of musicians, The Homeboys Band, and the programme explores the impact of HIV/AIDS on young adults through the lives of the band members, their families, and friends. Three additional interweaving storylines communicate specific behaviour change objectives through transitional characters. There is the storyline of Mainda (Elizabeth Michael) and her mother Monika who have a tenuous relationship. Their story stresses the importance of parent-child communication in protecting youth as they navigate through the difficult period of adolescence. Tausi, an HIV-positive woman who eventually joins the band, is a talented young musician trying to pursue her dreams. Tausi’s story explores the challenges of disclosure, living positively, and confronting stigma. Ray, also HIV-positive, models the trials and tribulations of anti-retroviral treatment (ART). Ray works at the local Masifa (Pride) radio station, and, on his music talk-show Mwale wa Jua (Ray of Sunshine), he conducts live interviews of contemporary Tanzanian musicians.

Wahapahapa as the part of Mwamba Ngoma documentary won, Best Feature Documentary at the Northwest Film Festival, 2011; and nominated for best documentary at FESPACO and at the 6th Africa Movie Academy Awards.
