= Martin Kolikoli =

Tanzanian basketball player

Personal information
- Born: May 25, 1989 (age 36); Dar es Salaam, Tanzania
- Listed height: 6 ft 2 in (1.88 m)
- Listed weight: 189 lb (86 kg)

Career information
- High school: Loyola High School
- Position: Power forward

Martin Kolikoli, also known as Martin Ndunguru, (born May 25, 1989, in Dar es Salaam) is a Tanzanian professional basketball player for Pazi Basketball Team in Tanzania. He is 6'2" tall and weighs 189 lbs. Martin grew up playing the power forward position for Loyola High School in Tanzania.

== Basketball career ==
The Tanzania Basketball Federation selected Kolikoli as its sole representative for the 2008 Basketball Without Borders Programme, held at American International School of Johannesburg and organized by the National Basketball Association and International Basketball Federation.

After returning from the camp, Kolikoli was invited to participate in the under-21 national team of Tanzania.

With all the events in the past year, Martin Kolikoli is currently an undrafted NBA free agent after placing his name in the 2009 NBA Draft. Represented locally in Tanzania by DWM Sports Agency by agent David Ngonyani and internationally by John Domantry. Currently, Martin is in Tanzania helping around in Charity basketball events.

=== Personal life ===
The son of Urban and Bernadette Ndunguru, he has two sisters named Jokate and Desi Mwegelo and a brother named Magavilla Constantine. Martin comes for a family filled with basketball; his cousin Louis Charles Ngonyani played for the team Martin now plays in Pazi for four seasons (1994–98) but stopped to focus more on studying. His other cousin David Wilbard Ngonyani is still an active player in the ACAMIS and ISAC league of Beijing, China.
