= Mapenzi Ya Mungu =

2014 film by Alex Wasponga

- Promotional poster
- Directed by: Alex Wasponga
- Screenplay by: Leah Mwendamseke (Lamata)
- Story by: Elizabeth Michael
- Produced by: Elizabeth Michael
- Starring: Elizabeth Michael; Linah Sanga; Flora Mtegoha
- Edited by: Farid Uwezo
- Production company: Uwezo Production
- Distributed by: Proin Promotions
- Release date: 30 October 2014
- Running time: 70 minutes
- Country: Tanzania
- Language: Swahili

Mapenzi Ya Mungu, also known as God's Love, is a 2014 Tanzanian drama film directed by Alex Wasponga and produced by Elizabeth Michael. It stars Michael, Linah Sanga, and Florah Mtegoha.

== Cast ==
- Elizabeth Michael as Shikana
- Linah Sanga as Neema
- Florah Mtegoha
- Musa Yusuph as Kitale

== Production ==
=== Filming ===
The film was shot in Dar Es Salaam.

=== Marketing ===
The trailer was released on Proin Promotion's YouTube Channel.

== Release ==
The film was screened at the Zanzibar International Film Festival and was nominated to compete for the Zuku Bongo Movies Awards. It was released on 27 October 2014 online and through DVD release.

== Awards and nominations ==
Year	Event	Prize	Recipient	Result	Ref.
2015	Zanzibar International Film Festival	Zuku Bongo Movie Awards	Mapenzi Ya Mungu	Nominated	
2016	2016 Africa Magic Viewers Choice Awards	Best Movie East Africa	Mapenzi Ya Mungu	Won	
