= Ni Noma =

- Directed by: Karabani
- Screenplay by: Novatus Mugurus (RrahC)
- Story by: Johnson Lukaza
- Produced by: Elizabeth Michael
- Starring: Elizabeth Michael; Kulwa Kikumba; Isarito Mwakalikamo
- Cinematography: Lusubilo Mwanguku
- Edited by: Tunda Salum; Kelvin Gwasa
- Production company: Proin Promotions
- Distributed by: Proin Promotions
- Release date: 15 July 2016; (online)
- Running time: 78 minutes
- Country: Tanzania
- Language: Swahili ( English subtitles )

Ni Noma is the 2016 Tanzanian dramedy starring Elizabeth Michael and supporting actors Kulwa Kikumbe and Isarito Mwakalikamo.

== Synopsis ==
Angela is a young beautiful woman who uses her beauty to live a lavish lifestyle by conning men. One day her investment suddenly dumps her and Angela decides to take the conning game to the next level by getting a job in a corporate company by seducing the boss. Without any of the skills she was hired to have, she relies on an intelligent security guard named Steve to do her office work. What she doesn't realize is that her past is about to catch up with her and change her life forever.

== Cast ==
- Elizabeth Michael as Angela
- Isarito Mwakalikamo as Steven
- Kulwa Kikumba as Daniel

== Production ==
Ni Noma was shot in Dar Es Salaam, Tanzania, and was produced by Proin Promotions Tanzania Ltd. Principal photography was released in 2015 during the shooting. The film produced by actress Elizabeth Michael and it is her third film to put effort as a producer.

== Promotion ==
The movie was teased on social networks. In July before the release of the movie, Elizabeth Michael (Lulu) the producer of the movie made a media tour so as to promote the movie. She did a tour at Bongo5.com, one of the biggest Tanzanian websites. She also made a tour with director Karabani at Clouds Tv to promote the movie. She also made a tour at BBC Swahili radio.

== Release ==
The first teaser trailer was released on May 24, 2016 on Proin Promotions' YouTube channel, and lead actress/producer Elizabeth Michael then uploaded different teasers on various social networks. The official trailer for the movie was released on June 23, 2017 on Proin Promotions' YouTube channel. The movie was officially released on July 15, 2016 online; people could buy the movie by downloading the application ProinBox. On June 12, 2020 The producer and leading actress of the movie Elizabeth Michael admitted that the movie did not meet a number of viewers due to the platform used to sell the movie. Therefore was uploaded on YouTube channel of Elizabeth Michael, the movie received more than 1 million views with positive reviews in less than a week making it the first Tanzanian movie to do so.
