= Kajala Masanja =

Tanzanian actress

- Born: 1983 (age 42–43)
- Occupation: Actress

Kajala Masanja (born 1983) is an actress and film star in Tanzania. She won the 2016 EATV (East Africa Television) award for actress. She was married to former banker Faraji Chambo.

She appeared in the 2012 film Kijiji Cha Tambua Haki with Steven Kanumba. She is the subject of industry gossip.

She was in Basilisa (2011) and Jeraha la Moyo (2012).

== Filmography ==
- Kigodoro
- Jeraha la Moyo
- House Boy
- Vita Baridi
- House Girl & Boy
- Dhuluma
- Shortcut
- Basilisa
- You Me and Him
- Devils Kingdom

== See also ==
- Cinema of Tanzania
