= Foolish Age =

- Directed by: Chidy Classic
- Screenplay by: Ally Yakuti
- Story by: Mandela Nicholus
- Produced by: Elizabeth Michael
- Starring: Elizabeth Michael; Diana Kimaro; Hashimu Kambi; Jengua; Ombeni Phiri; Mandela Nicholus
- Edited by: Chidy Classic
- Production company: Classic Production
- Distributed by: Proin Promotions
- Release date: 31 August 2013
- Running time: 120 minutes
- Country: Tanzania
- Language: Swahili with English subtitles

Foolish Age is a Tanzanian drama film released in 2013. It was produced by Elizabeth Michael. The film explores adverse and destructive influences faced by teenagers.

== Synopsis ==
The film tells the story of Loveness (Elizabeth Michael), a young girl who has been raised by her rich father after the death of her mother years ago who died from HIV/AIDS. Loveness and her father are also living with HIV/AIDS. Loveness is studying abroad but she later forces her father to let her study in her home country, Tanzania. She finds a new school and makes new friends, but her best friend (Diana Kimaro) is not a good girl. They engage themselves in love affairs at a young age with different men. They stop attending school in favor of club life and changing men. Loveness leaves her father's well-appointed house without saying goodbye to him and goes to live the ghetto life. Her father searches everywhere for her but cannot find her and gives up. Loveness continues with that kind of life but later faces life struggles, sexual abuse, and issues with her friends.

== Cast ==
- Elizabeth Michael
- Diana Kimaro
- Hashim Kambi
- Emmylia Joseph
- Ombeni Phiri
- Mandela Nicholaus
- Ramadhani Miraji
- Mohamed Fungafunga (billed on the poster under alias "Jengua")
- Zamaradi Salim
- Soud Ali
- Idrisa Makupa
- Leah Mussa
- Tiko Hassan

== Production ==
The production company was Classic Production, with Chidy Classic directing. It was produced by Elizabeth Michael in her debut as producer.

== Release ==
The movie was launched on August 31, 2013, at Mlimani City Conference Hall in Dar es Salaam, Tanzania, with a performance from Lady Jaydee, Barnaba and Amini. The movie was later released in DVD and online. In 2014, it was screened at Zanzibar International Film Festival.

== Reception ==
The movies received mostly positive reviews and sold many copies in 2013. In 2014 she won Favorite Actress through her performance in the film and also the film was nominated for Favorite Movie at Tanzania People's Choice Awards.

== Awards and nominations ==
Year	Event	Prize	Recipient	Result
2014	Zanzibar International Film Festival	Official Selection	Foolish Age	Nominated
2014	Tanzania People's Choice Awards (Tuzo Za Watu)	Favorite Actress	Elizabeth Michael	Won
2014	Tanzania People's Choice Awards (Tuzo Za Watu)	Favorite Movie	Foolish Age	Nominated
