= Mzee Chillo =

Tanzanian actor (born 1950)

- Born: Ahmed Olotu; 12 September 1950 (age 75); Moshi, Tanzania
- Education: Islamic University of Medina, Saudi Arabia
- Occupations: Actor, singer, writer, director, producer, comedian
- Years active: 2003–present
- Children: 1

Ahmed Olotu (born 9 December 1950) popularly known as Mzee Chillo is a Tanzanian veteran actor. He has starred in over 100 movies in his film career. He has been featured in both regional and international films making him among the greatest Tanzanian actors of all time. He has starred in movies with big names on the African film industry including Steven Kanumba, African stars Nkiru Sylvanus, Emmanuel France and Mercy Johnson.

== Early life ==
Olotu attended his elementary school at Majengo Primary school in Kilimanjaro, Moshi, Tanzania from early 1957 to late 1964. He then joined Azania High school in Dar es Salaam to pursue his secondary education from 1966 to 1969. In 1970 he attended an administrative course at the Civil service center in Dar es Salaam. After completing this course, he started working for the ministry of agriculture as a junior administrator in mid-1971. He also worked at Bora Shoes Company for a couple of years. He later traveled to Saudi Arabia to acquire Islamic knowledge at the Islamic university. When he came back from Saudi Arabia, he became a high school teacher and taught in a couple of schools in Moshi, Tanzania. The schools include Weruweru girl's high school, Kibosho girls high school, Old Moshi secondary school, and Majengo secondary school.

== Personal life ==
Olotu is married with one child named Fatuma Ahmed Olotu. He currently lives with his family in Dar es Salaam, Tanzania.

== Films movies ==
Although Ahmed has been acting since elementary school and did a couple of theatre performances, he had his first film feature in 2003 titled Sumu ya Mapenzi then later on in the same year did Tanzia, both done in Swahili. Since then, he has been featured in hundreds of films and earned respect in the East and Central Africa region.He has been featured in movies with big African acts. This includes Mercy Johnson, Emmanuel France, and Nkiru Sylvanus in Cross my sin movie and The director

== Filmography ==
=== International appearances and features ===
- Going Bongo – USA
- Cross my sin

=== Films ===
- Mapacha
- Deviation of marriage
- Miss bongo
- Fake pastors
- The same script
- Village pastor
- Heroes of the church
- Tears on Valentine's Day
- Blood test
- Ray of hope
- Lost
- Crush
- Simu ya kifo
- Pay Back
- Black Sunday
- Happy couples
- Usaliti
- Anti virus
- Lost twins
- Mfu Hai
- Pamoja
- Ndani ya matatizo
- Tax Driver
- Last Card
- Hot Friday
- Crash
- Branch of love
- Msimamo wangu
- Campus
- Trials
- Jezebele
- Mtandao
- Myororo
- Cut-off
- Hard times
- Rafiki hatari
- Desperado
- Mpishi
- College of music
- Sobbing sound
- Second wife
- Two days condition
- Cleopatra
- Kovu la Laana
- Sekunde chache
- Identical
- Lost dream
- Jamal
- Sweet and sour
- Maskini mwanangu
- Pooja
- Tears of a killer
- Siri ya mojo
- Dent mapepe
- Je umefunga mlango?
- Deni la haki
- Queen spear
- Mwaka wa shetani
- No more secrets
- Kovu la laana
- Jeraha la ndoa
- Oysterbay
- World of benefits
- Graduation day
- Sakata la penzi
- Too late
- My book
- Vagabond
- Pigo
- Greener
- Silent killer
- Dangerous girl
- 11 September
- Kalunde
- Bintinusa
- Misukosuko
- Yellow banana
- Shakira
- The Big Mistake
- Love clinic
- 3 names
- Ndani ya gunia
- Royal family
- Family poison
- Viola
- Fair game
- More than a liar
- Kisasi cha subiani
- Coppy
- I cant forget
- Where God is
- Machozi yangu
- The black Ghost
- Nyabo
- Hisia zangu
- Swadakta
- Utata
- Pretty teacher
- Albino
- Fingo
- Kaburi la mapenzi
- Trip to America
- Upande wa pili wa ndoa
- Script writer
- Love is war
- Sim card
- Mkataba
- Olopong
- The Golden Magic

=== Series ===
- Jumba la thahabu (aired on Tanzania Broadcasting Corporation)
- Unfaithful (aired on Africa Magic(M-Net))
- Indecency (airs on Tanzania Broadcasting Corporation)
- Awakening (aired on Africa Magic (M-Net))
- Martin (airs on Africa Magic(M-Net))
- Jasmine

== Other endeavours ==
Due to the popularity in the society, companies have featured Ahmed in numerous television and radio commercials. He has also featured in a couple of government and Non-governmental organisations in documentaries and campaigns.

== Awards ==
- Dogo dogo movie – UNICEF
- Ray of Hope- Zanzibar International Film Festival 2011
- Ray of Hope- 2013 Africa Magic Viewers Choice Awards
- Huba- Zanzibar International Film Festival 2010
