= Wema Sepetu =

Tanzanian beauty pageant winner, and actress (born 1984)

Wema A. Sepetu
- Born: 28 September 1985 (age 41); Dar es Salaam, Tanzania
- Other name: Sepenga
- Education: Limkokwing University of Creative Technology
- Occupations: Actress, entrepreneur
- Beauty pageant titleholder
- Title: Miss Tanzania 2006
- Years active: 2007–present
- Major competition: Miss Tanzania

Wema Isaac Sepetu (born 28 September 1988) is a Tanzanian actress and beauty pageant titleholder who won the Miss Tanzania 2006. She represented Tanzania at Miss World 2006, which was held in Poland.

== Early life and education ==
She hails from the diplomatic family of the late Abraham Sepetu. She is the last born in a family of four children.

She obtained her primary, secondary, and high school education at Academic International School in Dar Es Salaam, Tanzania. She later joined Limkokwing University of Creative Technology in Malaysia to pursue an international business course, which she did for one year and then dropped out to continue with acting.

== Miss Tanzania 2006 and Miss World 2006 ==
After winning the title of Miss Tanzania in 2006, Sepetu traveled to Warsaw, Poland to compete in the Miss World 2006 pageant.

== Career ==
=== Acting ===
Sepetu was introduced into the movie industry by the late Steven Kanumba while they were dating. She made her film debut in A Point of No Return. She played Dina, the main character, alongside Steven Kanumba. The character is a young lady who is forced by her family to marry the witch man Lameck (Steven Kanumba), who is not her choice.

Sepetu later appeared in many movies, such as Family Tears, Red Valentine, and White Maria, which made her one of the most popular actresses in Tanzania. She has appeared in more than 20 films.

In 2011 she produced the movie Superstar, about her love life with musician Diamond Platnumz. The movie was launched in 2012 at the Kilimanjaro Hyatt Regency Hotel in Dar Es Salaam and was graced by many people including Omotola Jalade Ekeinde from Nigeria who was the guest of honour. However, the movie did not enter into the market until today, and Sepetu has said that she is still looking for a distributor.

Sepetu then appeared in the movies Basilisa, It Was Not Me, House Boy, Madame, and others.

In 2014, she collaborated with Van Vicker from Ghana to produce a movie called Day After Death starring herself and Van Vicker. The film was planned to be released in 2015 but due to delays it has not yet been released.

Sepetu appeared in movies from 2015 to 2016 including Family, Mapenzi Yamerogwa and Chungu Cha Tatu.

In 2017, she made a comeback with the film Heaven Sent, which she produced and played the lead, alongside alim Ahmed (Gabo). The launch took place at Century Cinemax Mlimani City Dar Es Salaam Tanzania. The movie was sold via her mobile application Wema App. It received seven nominations at the 2018 Sinema Zetu International Film Festival Awards, including Best Actress and Best Feature Film; Sepetu won Best Actress and the movie won People's Choice.

=== Endless Fame Production ===
In 2013, Sepetu launched her company called Endless Fame Production. The company deals with movies production and artists' management. They have managed Tanzanian musicians such as Mirror and Ally Luna. The company has produced movies such as Superstar, Unexpected, Day After Death, Family, and Heaven Sent.

== Filmography ==
=== Movies ===
Year	Title	Role	Notes
2007	A Point of No Return	Dina	with Steven Kanumba and Mahsein Awadh
2008	Family Tears	Asteria/Joyce Damian	with Steven Kanumba, Elizabeth Michael, and Richard Benzdnheout
2009	Red Valentine	Vivian	with Steven Kanumba, Jacqueline Wolper
2010	Sakata	Beatrice	with Tuesday Kihangala, Jacq Pentezel, Kabula
2010	White Maria	Catherine	with Steven Kanumba
2010	Tafrani	Winnie	with Jumbe Yusuph, Shemson Alexander
2011	14 Days	Irene	with Jacob Steven, Mahsein Awadh
2011	Lerato	Lerato	with Jacob Steven and Single Mtambalike
2011	Basilisa	Natalia	with Issa Mussa, Kajala Masanja, Suleiman Barafu, Dokii
2011	The Diary	Queen	with Rose Ndauka and Jacquline Pentezel
2011	DJ Ben	Natalie	with Jacob Steven and Irene Uwoya
2012	Crazy Tenant	Miss Cecilia	with Peter Msechu
2012	House Boy	Mama Lulu	with Elizabeth Michael, Kajala Masanja, Suleiman Barafu and Mr Blue
2012	It Was Not Me	Sheila	with Yusuph Mlela, Riyama Ally
2014	Madame	Madame	with Rado, Soudy Ally, Deogratious Shija
2015	Mapenzi Yamerogwa	Sarah	with Riyama Ally, Aunty Ezekiel and Hemedi Suleiman
2015	Saa Mbovu		with Aunty Ezekiel
2015	Chungu Cha Tatu	Doreen	with Jacob Steven and Patcho Mwamba
2016	Family	Aileena	with Aunty Ezekiel and Hemed Suleiman
2017	Kisogo		short film - with Salim Ahmed (Gabo)
2017	Heaven Sent	Samira	with Salim Ahmed (Gabo)
2018	Day After Death		with Van Vicker
2018	Mary Mary	Kalekwa	
2019	More Than a Woman		with Hemed Suleiman
2020	Tukae		short film

=== Television ===
Year	Name	Role	Note
2020	Karma	Dr. Desire	Aired on Maisha Magic Bongo (Dstv Channel) Also executive producer
2020–2021	We Men	Tatiana	Aired on Startimes Television

== Awards and nominations ==
Year	Event	Prize	Recipient	Result
2014	Ijumaa Sexiest Girl	Sexiest Girl	Herself	Won
2014	Swahili Fashion Week Awards	Style Icon of the Year	Herself	Nominated
2015	Tanzania People's Choice Awards	Favorite Actress	Herself	Won
2015	Tanzania People's Choice Awards	Favorite TV Show	Wema Sepetu: In My Shoes	Nominated
2015	Nzumari Awards (Kenya)	Female Personality of the Year (East Africa)	Herself	Won
2016	Abryanz Style and Fashion Awards	Best Dressed Celebrity (East Africa)	Herself	Won
2017	Swahili Fashion Week Awards	Female Stylish Personality of the year	Herself	Won
2018	Sinema Zetu International Film Festival	Best Actress	Heaven Sent	Won
2018	Sinema Zetu International Film Festival	Best Feature Film (as a producer)	Heaven Sent	Nominated
2018	Sinema Zetu International Film Festival	People's Choice (as a producer)	Heaven Sent	Won
2019	Sinema Zetu International Film Festival	Best Actress	More Than a Woman	Nominated
2019	Sinema Zetu International Film Festival	Best Feature Film (as a producer)	More Than a Woman	Nominated
