= Mzee Majuto =

Tanzanian Actor

- Born: Alhaji Amri Athumani; 1 August 1948; Tanga Region, Tanganyika Territory
- Died: 8 August 2018 (aged 70); Dar es Salaam, Tanzania
- Occupation(s): Actor comedian film director screenwriter film producer

Alhaji Amri Athumani (1 August 1948 – 8 August 2018 ) well known as Mzee Majuto was a Tanzanian comedian, actor, director, screenwriter and film producer.

== Biography ==
He studied at Msambweni secondary school located in Tanga Region. He started acting in 1958 (at the age of 9 to 10); at that time he was acting on the stages. Mzee Majuto was featured in dozens of films including a franchise 'Siri ya Marehemu' starred by Mohamed Fungafunga alias 'Jengua'.

== Treatment ==
On April 28, 2018, Minister of information, arts and sports at the time, Harrison Mwakyembe visited Mzee Majuto at the Muhimbili National Hospital where he was being treated . On that day, Minister Mwakyembe announced the intention of the Tanzanian government to send Mzee Majuto to India for further treatment. Originally, King Majuto was reported to be suffering from Prostate cancer and he started his treatment in Tanzania . On May 1, Mzee Majuto was reportedly flown to India for further treatment.

He was treated in India until his health improved and he returned to Tanzania to continue his clinic at the Muhimbili National hospital.

== Death ==
Mzee Majuto was reported to be overwhelmed, a situation that led to his re-admission to Muhimbili National Hospital in the intensive care unit ( ICU ). He was pronounced dead on August 8, 2018, at two o'clock in the night in the wards of Mwaisera, in Muhimbili National Hospital. He was buried at his hometown in Tanga Region.
