= Tanzania Public Service College =

Public university in Tanzania

Coordinates: 06°48′54″S 39°16′51″E

- Chuo Cha Utumishi Wa Umma (Swahili)
- Motto in English: Training For Improved Performance
- Type: Public
- Established: 1991; 35 years ago
- Chancellor: Emmanuel Shindika
- Location: Dar es Salaam, Tabora, Singida, Tanga, Mbeya and Mtwara, Tanzania
- Website: tpsc.go.tz

The Tanzania Public Service College (TPSC), an institution of higher learning in Tanzania, mandated to offer courses that prepare school leavers for effective delivery of public service to the citizens of the country. The institution also offers refresher courses to active public servants, to improve and update their knowledge-base and skills.

== Location ==
The College has six campuses at the following locations: Mtwara, Singida, Tanga, Mbeya, Tabora and Dar es Salaam. The main campus in Dar es Salaam is along Bibi Titi Mohammed Street, in the Upanga East neighborhood. The geographical coordinates of the Dar es Salaam campus are:06°48'54.0"S, 39°16'51.0"E (Latitude:-6.815000; Longitude:39.280833).

== Overview ==
Tanzania Public Service College was established to support public service department on training, consultancy and research in order to meet customers' satisfaction. Tanzania Public Service College is running some projects in various discipline in order to improve the quality of service. Some of the project are conducted with some supports from donors like CINOP. Cinop has done a lot to make sure that TPSC through participatory approach is adapting CBET (Competence Based Education Training). TPSC is registered as a Technical College in which Public Service Departments will have practical oriented staffs graduated from TPSC. In doing so CINOP has participated fully in the process of Improving ICT infrastructure, like Computer Labs and Information Resource Centre. Under this project, TPSC is the first institution in Africa to use a Dutch Computer application to manage computers systems known as ResPowerfuse. Also TPSC is using IGEL technology. So TPSC is making efforts to make sure that staff are competent to deliver the service and to utilize the available resources.

== Academic programmes ==
The college offers certificates, diplomas and bachelors degrees in various disciplines, including the following:

Academic Courses Offered At Tanzania Public Service College
Rank	Course	Duration in Months	Notes
1	Certificate in Information Technology	12	
2	Certificate in Public Procurement and Supplies Management	12	
3	Certificate in Local Government Administration	12	
4	Certificate in Public Administration	12	
5	Certificate in Records Management	12	
6	Certificate in Secretarial Studies	12	
7	Certificate in Human Resource Management	12	
8	Diploma in Law	24	
9	Diploma in Public Sector Financial Management	24	
10	Diploma in Accountancy	24	
11	Diploma in Information Technology	24	
12	Diploma in Public Procurement and Supplies Management	24	
13	Diploma in Local Government Administration	24	
14	Diploma in Public Administration	24	
15	Diploma in Secretarial Studies	24	
16	Diploma in Records Management	24	
17	Diploma in Human Resource Management	24	
18	Bachelor's Degree in Records, Archives and Information Management	36	
19	Bachelor's Degree in Secretarial Studies and Management	36	
