= Jokate Mwegelo =

Tanzanian politician (born 1987)

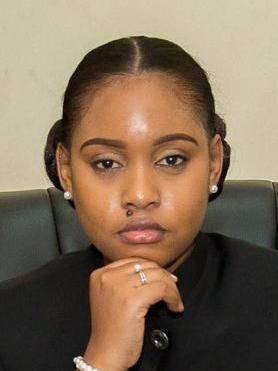

Secretary General National Youth’s League of Chama Cha Mapinduzi
- Incumbent
- Assumed office April 2024
- Preceded by: Fakih Lulandala

Secretary General National Women’s Wing of Chama Cha Mapinduzi
- In office October 2023 – April 2024
- Preceded by: Dr. Philis Nyimbi

District Commissioner Korogwe District
- In office January 2023 – October 2023
- President: Samia Suluhu Hassan
- Preceded by: Basila Mwanukuzi
- Succeeded by: William Mwakilema

District Commissioner Temeke District
- In office 2021–2023
- President: Samia Suluhu Hassan
- Preceded by: Godwin Gondwe

District Commissioner Kisarawe District
- In office 2018–2021
- President: John Magufuli
- Succeeded by: Nickson John

Personal details
- Born: Jokate Urban Mwegelo; 20 March 1987 (age 39) U.S.
- Relations: Martin Kolikoli (Brother)
- Education: Open University of Tanzania (MA) Uongozi Institute/Aalto University (PGDip) University of Dar Es Salaam (BPS)
- Occupation: Politics; Entrepreneur
- Website: www.instagram.com/jokatemwegelo

Jokate Mwegelo is a Tanzanian politician and Secretary General of the Chama cha Mapinduzi’s Youth Wing (UVCCM). Before being appointed, she was an entrepreneur and a media personality. In July 2018, the President of Tanzania Dr. John Pombe Joseph Magufuli appointed Mwegelo as the new District Commissioner for Kisarawe district in Pwani region. She was then appointed as the District Commissioner for Temeke District in the Dar es Salaam Region in July 2021. Mwegelo was appointed by the President of Tanzania Dr. Samia Suluhu Hassan as the District Commissioner for Korogwe District in the Tanga Region in January, 2023 . She is a member of Chama Cha Mapinduzi, previously serving as Secretary in charge of Public Relations and Mobilization of the UVCCM - youth wing of Chama Cha Mapinduzi.

In October 2023, Jokate was appointed by the Central Committee of Chama Cha Mapinduzi led by President Samia Suluhu Hassan to be Secretary General of the UWT - the Women's Wing of Chama cha Mapinduzi.

She is one ofTanzania's youngest influential leaders and entrepreneurs. In 2017, Mwegelo was included in Forbes 30 Under 30 in Africa. In August 2017 she was named by Africa Youth Awards among the 100 Most Influential Young Africans. The 2018 Most Influential Young Tanzanians by Avance Media place her as the third most influential young Tanzanian and the most influential young Tanzanian under the category of Law and Governance .

== Early life and education ==
Mwegelo was born on 20 March 1987, in Washington, D.C., where her parents worked. She was raised in Dar es Salaam, Tanzania. She started primary school at Olympio Primary School, where she served as a prefect.

She attended St. Anthony Secondary School from January 2000, where she received her ordinary secondary education, graduating in 2003 with a Certificate of Secondary Education. She served as Assistant Head Girl from 2002 to 2003. In 2002, during the Model United Nations General Assembly in Tanzania she was appointed to serve as the Secretary General.

In March 2004, she joined Loyola High School in Dar Es Salaam, Tanzania to pursue her Advanced Secondary Education, graduating in February 2006 with an Advanced Certificate of Secondary Education. Mwegelo served as a prefect responsible for coordinating all club activities at the school from 2004 to 2005. She was selected as the head prefect for the school from 2005 to 2006. In April 2005, at the inter commonwealth essay competition organized by the Commonwealth of Nations she was awarded 2nd place for best essay. Nationally, she ranked 2nd among female candidates in the English language examination.

Mwegelo attended the University of Dar Es Salaam from 2007 to 2010 where she graduated Bachelor of Arts with Honors in Political Science B.P.S. and Philosophy with a G.P.A of 4.0. Mwegelo was the founder and coordinator of the University of Dar Es Salaam United Nations Association Chapter in 2008. With other students and partners, Mwegelo organized various initiatives including the Stand Up Campaign towards the MDGs in 2009, commemoration of the International Day of Peace with United Nations Information Centres in 2009 and the Mwalimu Nyerere Intellectual Festival (Kigoda cha Mwalimu) at the University of Dar Es Salaam in 2010. Mwegelo also served as the President of the Tanzania International Student Week in 2009.

== Leadership and political career ==
Mwegelo is a member of Chama Cha Mapinduzi, the dominant and ruling party in Tanzania. She was appointed as the Acting Secretary of Public Relations and Mobilization in the youth wing of the ruling party (UVCCM). She was among the 450 members of the party that contested to be elected to represent Tanzania as a member in the East African Legislative Assembly.

From a young age Mwegelo has shown leadership traits, starting as a prefect in primary school. She went on to serve as Assistant Head Girl at St. Anthony Secondary School from 2002 to 2003, during the time she was also appointed as the Secretary General for Model United Nations General Assembly in Tanzania in 2002. In high school at Loyola High School from 2004 to 2006 she served as a prefect in charge of coordinating club activities at the school from 2004 to 2005. In 2005 she was elected as Head Prefect until 2006 when she graduated high school. Mwegelo's leadership career excelled during her time at university where she was engaged in various activities including being vice-president of marketing and public relations for the International Students Week in Tanzania from 2007 to 2008 and in 2009 she became the President of the International Students Week in Tanzania. Mwegelo was the project creative coordinator of the United Nations Association initiative together with UNIFEM on 16 days against violence on women and girls in 2009. She was appointed as the local ambassador for the Live Global Run water initiative in 2010. In 2011, she was appointed as Ambassador for the Walk for Water initiative that benefitted 100,000 villagers in Bagamoyo.

On 28 July 2018, President John Magufuli appointed her to serve as the District Commissioner of Kisarawe District and was sworn in on 3 August 2018.

== Entrepreneurship ==
=== Kidoti ===
In October 2012, she officially launched her company Kidoti Loving Company Limited, the launch went together with introduction of her new hairline. The company did well and in December 2014, she founded Kidoti. She partnered with RainBow Shell Craft, from China. Her company produces slippers, wigs, school bags and other fashion accessories, under the Kidoti brand. Her company introduced the Be Kidotified campaign to empower students. Her firm has worked with Mohammed Dewji. In March 2017, Clouds Media Group honored her with the Malkia wa Nguvu Award in business innovation in Tanzania. In 2017 she was nominated at the Africa Youth Awards for Entrepreneur Of The Year and her company Kidoti was nominated for Startup Of The Year.

Through her company Kidoti, Mwegelo has organized various social and community activities. In 2015 the Kidoti inter-school Bonanza was organized and hosted by Mwegelo which was a talent and networking bonanza featuring 20 schools from Dar Es Salaam region and involved over 4000 students. In the same year, Mwegelo also organized Manjano Dream Makers mentorship program. In 2016, the 'Be Kidotified' campaign was launched with the aim of improving the learning environment in public schools, basketball and netball sport facilities were launched at the Jangwani Girls Secondary School.

== Awards, honors and nominations ==
=== Awards and nominations ===
Year	Event	Prize	Recipient	Result
2006	Vodacom Miss Tanzania	Miss Tanzania	Herself	2nd Runner-up
2011	Zanzibar International Film Festival	Best Actress in Swahili Films	Chumo	Won
2012	2012 Nigeria Entertainment Awards	Pan African Actress of the Year	Chumo	Nominated
2013	Swahili Fashion Week Awards	Female Stylish Personality Award	Herself	Won
2013	Under30 Youth Awards	Fashion Category	Herself	Won
2015	Zanzibar International Film Festival	Best Actress in Swahili Films	Mikono Salama	Won
2015	Swahili Fashion Week Awards	Baileys Female Stylish Personality	Herself	Won
2017	Clouds Fm Malkia Wa Nguvu Awards	Business Innovation	Herself	Won
2017	Africa Youth Awards	Entrepreneur Of The Year	Herself	Nominated
2017	Africa Youth Awards	Startup Of The Year	Kidoti Company	Nominated
2018	AvanceMedia Most Influential Young Tanzanians	Law & Governance	Herself	Won

=== Honours ===
- 2011: 25 Young African Women Leaders, Milead Fellowship Program
- 2017: Forbes 30 Under 30 in Africa, Forbes Africa
- 2017: 100 Most Influential Young Africans, Africa Youth Awards

== Work, volunteering and personal ==
=== Work ===
Mwegelo was a TV presenter for the show Bongo Star Search for the 2006/2007 season which was a singing competition seeking to discover music talent from across Tanzania, she also hosted TV Shows and live events from 2006 to 2007. In 2010, Mwegelo became a regular contributor for The Citizen magazine in Tanzania for Saturday's edition covering women and girls related issues. In 2012, she started managing Kidoti Brand and Company which she still manages.

=== Volunteering ===
Mwegelo volunteers through the Tanzania Youth Cultural Organization and Tanzania Mitindo House that deals with taking care of children affected by HIV/AIDS.

=== Personal life ===
She is the daughter of Urban and Bernadette Ndunguru, she has a sister named Desi Mwegelo and brothers named Magavilla Constantine and Martin Kolikoli, she comes from a family filled with love for basketball; her cousin Louis Charles Ngonyani played for Pazi Basketball Team for four seasons (1994–98). Her other cousin David Wilbard Ngonyani is still an active player in the ACAMIS and ISAC league of Beijing, China. Mwegelo uses her spare time to catch up with world politics and is a reading enthusiast. Through her personal experiences she writes journals, articles and short stories. She loves engaging with the youth through participating in youth initiatives, motivational talks and outdoor games like basketball.
