= Irene Uwoya =

Tanzanian actress and businesswoman (born 1981)

- Born: Irene Pancras Uwoya; December 18, 1981 (age 44); Dar Es Salaam, Tanzania
- Occupation: Actress • Film producer • Film director • Entrepreneur
- Years active: 2006-present
- Notable work: Yolanda • Oprah
- Spouses: Hamad Ndikumana (2008 - 2013); Dogo Janja (2017 - 2018)
- Children: Krish (2011)
- Awards: 2008 Tanzania Vinara Film Awards
- Website: ireneuwoya.co.tz

Irene Pancras Uwoya (born December 18, 1981) is a Tanzanian actress, producer and entrepreneur. She is best known for her career name Irene Uwoya and for her movie role Oprah. She began her professional career in 2007 along with other bongo movie actors such as Vincent Kigosi, Steven Kanumba and many more.

== Early life ==
Uwoya was born on December 18, 1988, in Dodoma, Tanzania. She started her primary school in Mlimwa School and later moved to Bunge School in Dar-es-salaam. She later went to Greenville, in Kampala, Uganda for secondary education.

== Personal life ==
In 2008 Irene married the Rwandan football player and the captain of the Rwanda international selection Hamad Ndikumana. In 2011 the couple had one child named Krish and a few years later the couple split. In 2017 she married again, this time to the bongo flava musician Abdulaziz Chande known professionally as Dogo Janja.

== Career ==
In 2006 she contested the Miss Tanzania beauty pageant and became fifth; Wema Sepetu was crowned Miss Tanzania 2006–2007.

Irene Uwoya began her career as an actress in Bongo Movies in 2007. She has featured in more than 20 movies in and out of Tanzania.

== Filmography ==
=== Film ===
Year	Title	Role	Notes
2008	Yolanda	Advocate	
2008	Diversion of Love		
2008	Oprah	Oprah	
2008	Tanzanite		
2009	Shakira	Shakira	
2009	Mid Night		
2009	Damu Moja		
2009	Peace of Mind	Diana	
2009	My Dreams		
2009	Pretty Girl	Scola	
2010	Fair Decision		
2010	Off Side	Alice	
2011	Eagle Eyes	Rebecca	
2011	Kiapo	Akida	
2011	Senior Bachelor	Nuru	
2011	Dj Ben		
2011	Chupa Nyeusi		
2012	Mtihani		
2012	Sobbing Sound	Menina	
2012	Bar Maid		
2012	Ngumi ya Maria	Maria	
2013	Doa la Ndoa	Winfrida	
2013	Last Card		
2013	Nyota Yangu	Jojo	
2013	Zawadi Yangu	Zawadi	
2013	Safari		
2013	Question Mark		
2013	Omega Confusion	Omega	
2013	Nyati		
2013	Money Talk		
2014	The Return of Omega	Omega	
2014	Snitch		
2014	Rosemary	Rosemary	
2014	Figo		
2014	Aliyemchokoza Kaja		
2014	Mikono Salama	Aurelia	
2014	Who is My Child		
2016	Wake up		
2016	Pain 4 Nothing	Magreth	
2017	Bei Kali	Tausi	
2022	Nuru	Nuru	Short Film Also Executive Producer
TBA	Olema	-	

=== Television ===
Year	Title	Role	Notes
2017-2020	Sarafu	Janeth	Aired on Dstv Channel "Maisha Magic Bongo"
2021	Haikufuma	Natalia	Aired on Azam TV
2024	Mzani wa Mapenzi	Cleopatra	Aired on Azam TV

== Awards and nominations ==
Year	Event	Prize	Recipient	Result
2008	Tanzania Vinara Film Awards	Best Supporting Actress	Diversion of Love	Nominated
2008	Tanzania Vinara Film Awards	Best Upcoming Actress	Diversion of Love	Won
2008	Tanzania Vinara Film Awards	Best Villain	Diversion of Love	Nominated
2013	Steps Entertainment Awards	Best Leading Actress	Bar Maid	Won
2015	Tanzania Film Awards	Best Actress In Supporting Role	Who is My Child	Nominated
2021	Tanzania Film Board Awards	Best Actress - Audience Choice	Haikufuma	Nominated
