= Vincent Kigosi =

Tanzanian actor, producer and director (born 1980)

- Born: Vincent Kigosi; May 16, 1980 (age 46); Tanzania
- Other name: Ray the Greatest
- Occupations: Actor, producer, director
- Spouse: Chuchu Hans
- Children: 1
- Awards: see below

Vincent Kigosi (born 16 May 1980), also known as Ray, is a Tanzanian actor, producer and director. Kigosi is based in Dar-es-Salaam.

== Career ==
Kigosi, also known as Ray, started his career 2000 in television soap operas and series, and then started to appear in movies.

He has a film production company with fellow actor Blandina Chagula.

== Filmography ==
- Sikitiko Langu (with Steven Kanumba, Nuru Nasoro, Blandina Chagula)
- Dangerous Desire (with Steven Kanumba, Nuru Nasoro and Blandina Chagula)
- Johari (Steven Kanumba, Blandina Chagula)
- Peace of Mind (with Irene Uwoya, Jacob Steven, Blandina Chagula)
- Wicked Love (with Aunty Ezekiel and Blandina Chagula)
- Waves of Sorrow (with Rose Ndauka, Yobnesh Yusuph and Slim Omary)
- Oprah (with Steven Kanumba, Irene Uwoya)
- Off Side (with Steven Kanumba, Jacob Steven and Irene Uwoya)
- Woman of Principles (with Elizabeth Michael and Nargis Mohamed)
- Family Disaster (with Elizabeth Michael and Diana Kimaro)
- My Dreams (with Irene Uwoya, Rose Ndauka, Mahsein Awadh, Shamsa Ford and Elizabeth Michael)
- Sobbing Sound (with Irene Uwoya, Haji Adam)
- Unpredictable (with Irene Paul)
- Handsome Wa Kijiji (with Irene Paul, Flora Mvungi)
- Danger Zone (with Aunty Ezekiel, Mahsein Awadh, Elizabeth Gupta, Blandina Chagula)
- I Hate My Birthday (with Aunty Ezekiel and Irene Paul)
- Fair Decision
- Surprise
- V.I.P
- Chickens Head
- Too Much
- Twisted
- Second Wife
- The Glory of Ramadhani
- Hard Price
- Shell
- Shakira
- One Blood
- The Image
- Behind the Scene
- Revenge
- Fake Pastors
- Hot Friday
- Full Moon
- Divorce
- From China With True Love
- Fan's Death
- Pretty Girls
- Yellow Banana
- Bad Luck

== Awards and nominations ==
=== Tanzania People's Choice Awards ===
Year	Nominee / work	Award	Result
2014	Himself	Favourite Actor	Nominated
2015	Himself	Favourite Movie Director	Won

=== Steps Entertainment Awards ===
Year	Nominee / work	Award	Result
2013	Woman of Principles	Best Director	Won
2013	Rj Company	Best Film Company	Won

=== Zanzibar International Film Festival ===
Year	Nominee / work	Award	Result
2011	Himself	Tanzania Most Influential Movie Icon	Won

=== Action and Cut Viewers Choice Awards ===
Year	Nominee / work	Award	Result
2014	Himself	Lifetime Achievement	Won
2014	Twisted	Best Director	Nominated

=== Filamu Central Website Awards (Best of 2010) ===
Year	Nominee / work	Award	Result
2010		Best Director	Won
2010	Danger Zone	Best movie cover	Won
2010	Rj Company	Best Film Company	Won

=== Proin Promotions Awards ===
Year	Nominee / work	Award	Result
2015	Himself	Best Director	Won
