= Steven Kanumba =

Tanzanian Actor from Shinyanga Region

- Born: Steven Charles Kanumba; 8 January 1984; Shinyanga, Shinyanga Region, Tanzania
- Died: 7 April 2012 (aged 28); Dar es Salaam, Tanzania
- Cause of death: Brain concussion
- Occupations: Actor, singer, writer, director, producer, comedian
- Notable work: Jahazi
- Parents: Charles Kanumba (father); Flora Mutegoa (mother)

Steven Charles Kanumba (8 January 1984 – 7 April 2012) was a Tanzanian actor and director of Sukuma heritage, born in Shinyanga Region. Kanumba died in 2012 at the age of 28, for which actress Elizabeth Michael was convicted of involuntary manslaughter and sentenced to two years in prison in November 2017. Over 30,000 people were estimated to have attended his funeral. He was described as "Tanzania's most popular film star", and appeared in Nollywood films.

== Early life ==
Kanumba was born into a Sukuma family in the Shinyanga Region in Northern Tanzania. His father was Charles Kanumba and his mother was Flora Mutegoa. Kanumba had three older sisters. He began his studies at Bugoyi Primary School and continued with his secondary studies at Mwadui Secondary School, later transferring to Vosa Mission Secondary School. He joined Jitegemee High School for his high level education. He spoke three languages fluently: Swahili, Sukuma and English.

== Career ==
Kanumba began acting in the 1990s in church productions. In 2002, he joined the theater group Kaole Arts Group. He appeared in the television soap operas Jahazi and Dira and made his film debut in Haviliki. In 2006 he met Nazz who gave him advice and further connections for his career. He appeared in Dar 2 Lagos (Part 1) (Part 2), a film by Mtitu Game that used both Tanzanian and Nigerian cast. He also appeared in the films She is My Sister, This Is It, and Love Gamble. In 2009, he was a special celebrity guest on Big Brother Africa 4.

In 2011, Kanumba was named an Oxfam GROW Ambassador. Shortly before his death he had been preparing for his first Hollywood film role, despite him already being "Tanzania's most popular film star" and appeared in Nollywood films.

== Death ==
Kanumba died after he fell in his bedroom on 7 April 2012, apparently from a head injury after falling and hitting his head on the wall. Elizabeth "Lulu" Michael, his 17-year-old girlfriend at that time, was charged with manslaughter in connection with the death. Kanumba was taken unconscious to Muhimbili National Referral Hospital where he was declared dead. Michael was arrested and stayed in remand for almost a year for investigation. Later, the charges were amended to involuntary manslaughter.

In January 2013 Michael was granted bail. In October 2017 She testified to the High Court of Tanzania that after Kanumba confronted her, he took her to his room by force and started beating her with a sword while he was intoxicated. She claimed that Kanumba fell down and hit his head while beating her with the sword. In 2017, Lulu was convicted of involuntary manslaughter for his death and sentenced to two years in prison. Her sentence was then changed from two years imprisonment to community services and she was released from jail on 12 May 2018, after serving at least a year in jail.

His funeral was attended by around 30,000 people including the first lady of Tanzania, Salma Kikwete, Vice President Dr. Mohamed Gharib Bilal, and the minister for culture and sport, Emmanuel Nchimbi. Kanumba was buried in Kinondoni Cemetery.

== Filmography ==
=== Television ===
- Jahazi
- Dira
- Zizimo
- Tufani
- Sayari
- Taswira
- Gharika
- Baragumu

=== Film ===
Year	Title	Role	Notes
	Haviliki		
	Neno		
	Ulingo		
	Riziki		with Blandina Chagula
2006	Sikitiko Langu	Steve	with Nuru Nassoro, Vincent Kigosi and Mahsein Awadh
2006	Dangerous Desire	Jerry	with Vincent Kigosi, Nuru Nasoro and Blandina Chagula
2007	She is My Sister	Danny	with Mercy Johnson, Nkiru Sylvanus and Yvonne Cherrie
2007	Penina		with Mahsein Awadh, Emmanuel Myamba
	Cross My Sin		with Mercy Johnson, Suzan Lewis
	chizi wa dunia		with christopher bin bazuu
2007	A Point of No Return	Lameck	with Wema Sepetu, Mahsein Awadh
2008	The Lost Twins		with Lucky Peter, Elizabeth Michael, Suzan Lewis
2008	The Stolen Will	Christopher	with Eizabeth Chijumba, Immaculate Aloyce
2009	Village Pastor	Rev. Isaya	with Aunt Ezekiel
2009	Magic House	Gibson	with Nargis Mohamed, Issa mussa
2008	Oprah	Alfred	with Irene Uwoya and Vincent Kigosi
2009	Red Valentine	Nicholaus	with Wema Sepetu, Jacquline Wolper
2008	*Family Tears	Briton	with Elizabeth Michael, Wema Sepetu and Richard Bezednhout
	The Movie's Director		with Mercy Johnson, Nkiru Sylvanus, Elizabeth Chijumba, Olufemi ogdegbe
2009	Fake Smile	Bosco	with Aunt Ezekiel, Yobnesh Yusuph
	Unfortunate Love		with Lisa Jensen, Aunt Ezekiel, Elizabeth Michael
2009	Hero of the Church	Stephano	with Princess Sheila, Issa Musa, Juma kilowoko
	Saturday Morning		with Shamsa Ford, Hemed Suleiman, Issa Musa
	Shauku		
	Crazy Love		with Shamsa Ford, Hemed Suleiman, Issa Musa, Elizabeth Michael
2006	Johari	Hans	with Blandina Chagula and Vincent Kigosi)
2006	Dar 2 Lagos	Kanumba	with Mercy Johnson, Nancy Okeke, Bimbo Akintola
2010	More Than Pain		with Lisa Jensen and Rose Ndauka
2010	Young Billionaire		with Aunty Ezekiel and Patcho Mwamba
2010	"Ripple of tears"		with Elizabeth Michael
2010	Uncle JJ		with Khanifa Daudi (Jennifer), Patrick, Mayasa Mrisho and Patcho Mwamba
2010	This Is It		with Khanifa Daudi (Jennifer), Patrick, Mayasa Mrisho and Patcho Mwamba
2010	Off Side	Stewart	with Irene Uwoya, Vincent Kigosi and Jacob Steven)
2010	Payback		with Yvonne Cherrie, Yusuph Mlela)
2010	Black Sunday		with Yvonne Cherrie, Yusuph Mlela, Hemed Suleiman)
2010	Young billionaire		with Aunty Ezekiel and Patcho Mwamba
2011	Saturday Morning		with Irene Paul and Ben Franko
2011	Deception		with Rose Ndauka, Patcho Mwamba, Bakari Makuka
2011	Devil Kingdom	Ambrose Kapalala	with Ramsey Nouah, Kajala Masanja)
2011	The Shock		with Shazy Sadry
2011	Moses		With Suzan Lewis, Shazy Sadri, Ndumbangwe Misayo
2012	Big Daddy		
2012	Because of You		with Rose Ndauka and Grace Mapunda
2012	Ndoa Yangu		with Jacquline Wolper and Patcho Mwamba
2013	Love & Power		with Irene Paul and Patcho Mwamba; Kanumba's final movie

== Awards and nominations ==
Year	Event	Prize	Recipient	Result
2008	Vinara Movie Awards	Lifetime Achievement Award	Steven Kanumba	Won
2010	Mini-Ziff Awards	Best Movie	This Is It	Won
2010	Filamu Central Website Awards (Best of 2010)	Best Actor	Steven Kanumba	Won
2010	Filamu Central Website Awards (Best of 2010)	Best Producer		Won
2010	SFC Awards	Best Actor	Steven Kanumba	Won
2011	Zanzibar International Film Festival	Best Actor	Devil Kingdom	Won
2011	Zanzibar International Film Festival	Best Movie in Sound	Devil Kingdom	Won
2012	Baab Kubwa Magazine Awards	Best Actor	Steven Kanumba	Won
2013	Steps Entertainments Awards	Best Selling Movie	Ndoa Yangu	Won
2013	Steps Entertainments Awards	Best Movie of the Year	Kijiji Cha Tambua Haki	Won
2013	Steps Entertainments Awards	Posthumous Award	Steven Kanumba	Won
2014	Tanzania People's Choice Awards (Tuzo za watu)	Favourite Movie	Ndoa Yangu	Won
2015	Tanzania Film Awards	Tribute Personality Award	Steven Kanumba	Won
2015	Proin Promotions Awards	Best Actor	Steven Kanumba	Won
