= Jacqueline Wolper =

Tanzanian actress and fashion stylist

- Born: Jacqueline Wolper Massawe; 06 December 1982 (age 43); Moshi, Tanzania
- Other name: Wolper Stylish
- Occupations: Actress, movie producer, entrepreneur
- Years active: 2007–present
- Spouse: Rich Mitindo
- Children: 2
- Website: instagram.com/wolperstylish

Jacqueline Wolper Massawe (born 06 December 1982), is a Tanzanian actress, businesswoman and fashion stylist. Wolper began her film career in 2007 and has been featured in more than 30 films since her debut in the industry.

== Early life and education ==
Wolper was born and raised in Moshi, Tanzania. She attended Mawenzi Primary School before moving to Magrath, Ekenywa and Masai for her secondary school..

== Career ==
Wolper entered the Tanzanian film industry in 2007. The veteran actress Lucy Komba discovered and convinced her to join the movie industry. Wolper was working at her salon where Lucy was one of her regular clients. She first appeared in the movie produced by Lucy Komba “ Ama Zako Ama Zangu “ where she played as a secretary. She later appeared in “Oprah”, a movie by the late Steven Kanumba and his boss Mtitu Game. Her performance convinced the directors to cast her in further movies like “Family Tears” and “Red Valentine”. Her subsequent movies include Kipenzi Changu, Family Tears, Red Valentine, Surprise, Chaguo Langu, Candy, Taxi Driver and many more.

== Personal life ==
Wolper began dating the popular musician Harmonize in May 2016. However, the pair broke up in February 2017. She also had a relationship with his musical partner, Diamond Platnumz. Despite having an interest in Kenyan culture, Wolper stated she did not want to have a relationship with a Kenyan man.

In 2018, she announced that she had become a born-again Christian. Wolper is known for her controversial statements to the Tanzanian media, and she has expressed fear of being bewitched because of them.

== Filmography ==
=== Film ===
Year	Title	Role	Notes
2007	Ama Zako Ama Zangu	Secretary	
2007	Kipenzi Changu	Lilian	
2008	Oprah		
2008	Family Tears	Dr.Miranda	
2008	Roho Sita Revelation		
2009	Red Valentine	Victoria	
2009	Midnight		
2009	Unfortunate Love		
2009	Ndani Ya Gunia		
2009	Jozani		
2009	Last Minutes		
2009	Secretary	Sodana	
2010	Mtumwa wa Mapenzi		
2010	Avenger		
2010	Pete ya Ajabu		
2010	Life 2 Life	Tunu	
2010	Fake Love		
2010	Surprise		
2011	Candy	Candy	
2011	Mtegoni		
2011	Wrong Decision	Fiona	
2011	Eagle Eyes		
2011	All About Love		
2011	Mafisadi wa Mapenzi		
2011	Signature	Amanda	
2011	Shoga Yangu		
2011	Aching Heart		
2011	Determination	Laurine	
2011	Dunia Nyingine		
2011	The Impact		
2011	Mens Day Out		
2012	Dereva Taxi	Sharon	
2012	Clinic Love		
2012	Gaitan		
2012	Swadakta	Angel	
2012	God is Great		
2012	Moyo Wangu		
2012	Chaguo Langu	Elizabeth	
2012	Time After Time	Anna	
2012	My Intention		
2012	Diplomat		
2012	End of Evil	Sarah	
2012	Chocolate		
2012	Mtekaji	Queen	
2012	Ndoa Yangu	Sharon	
2012	Lupepo Village		
2012	Hukumu Ya Mande		
2012	Total Love		
2012	Pusi na Paku		
2013	Mr Nobody		
2013	Ulimi		
2013	Curse of Marriage		
2013	I'm Not Your Brother		
2013	Babylon		
2013	Identity Card		
2013	Before Marriage		
2013	Think Before		
2013	Pain For Pain		
2013	Mahaba Niue		
2013	Tikisa		
2013	My Princess		
2013	Impossible		
2013	After Death		
2013	Mbegu		
2013	Crazy Desire	Prisca	
2014	Nikole		
2014	Robson Rambo		
2014	Hard Price	Patricia	
2014	Tom Boy		
2014	V.I.P	Sharon (President Daughter)	
2015	Wake Up		
2017	Burundian in Dar	Kelly	
2019	Shabiusi	Sakina	

=== Television ===
Year	Title	Role	Notes
2018-2020	Kapuni	Prisca	Aired in Magic Magic Bongo (Dstv Channel)
2021–present	Pazia	Miriam	Aired in Magic Magic Bongo (Dstv Channel)

== Awards and nominations ==
Year	Event	Prize	Recipient	Result
2010	Tanzania Smile Face Awards	Sexiest Actress	Herself	Won
2012	Ijumaa Magazine Awards	Ijumaa Sexiest Girl	Herself	Won
2014	Tanzania Peoples Choice Awards (Tuzo Za Watu)	Favorite Actress	Ndoa Yangu	Nominated
2015	Tanzania Peoples Choice Awards (Tuzo Za Watu)	Favorite Actress	Herself	Nominated
