= List of feature films with lesbian characters =

Symbol for female homosexuality

The following is a list of feature films with fictional and factual lesbian characters. The films were released theatrically, direct-to-video, or on a streaming platform (OTT network).

Films are in alphabetical order by year of release. Titles beginning with determiners "A", "An", and "The" are alphabetized by the first significant word.

== 20th century ==
=== 1900–1959 ===
List
Year	Title	Character(s)	Actor	Notes	Country	Ref(s)
1929	Pandora's Box	Countess Augusta Geschwitz	Alice Roberts	The Countess likes to wear a man's jacket, shirt, and tie as informal attire. She is in love with Lulu. At Lulu's wedding party, she looks at her longingly and finds an opportunity to dance with her. She then helps rescue Lulu from being taken to prison. Later, she goes in search of Lulu, who is hiding on a gambling ship, and gives her much-needed money. Lulu tells the Countess that she is being blackmailed by Rodrigo Quast, who threatens to turn her over to the police, and the Countess agrees to help Lulu by tricking Rodrigo into thinking that she is interested in him, luring him to his death. Countess Geschwitz is often cited as cinema's first explicit lesbian character.	Germany	
1931	Mädchen in Uniform	Manuela von Meinhardis	Hertha Thiele	The first film about a lesbian coming out.	Germany	
1936	Dracula's Daughter	Countess Marya Zaleska	Gloria Holden	Dracula's daughter, Countess Marya Zaleska, pursues and seduces women.	United States	
1940	Rebecca	Mrs. Danvers	Judith Anderson	Mrs. Danvers is the housekeeper of Manderley.	United States	
1954	Cecilia	Tore Sand	Tove Grethe Lill	Tore, who always wears trousers, is attracted to Cecilia.	Norway	
1958	Priestess with the Sullied Flesh	Eri Hira	Miyuki Takakura	Eri is raped by her brother's friend, has an abortion, and is forced by her father to join a convent and live as a nun. She becomes immersed in a relationship with Anna, a young novitiate.	Japan	
1958	Priestess with the Sullied Flesh	Yasuko "Anna" Kamiyama	Mayumi Ôzora	Eri is raped by her brother's friend, has an abortion, and is forced by her father to join a convent and live as a nun. She becomes immersed in a relationship with Anna, a young novitiate.	Japan	
1958	Touch of Evil	Gang leader	Mercedes McCambridge	Butch leader of a Mexican biker gang. She watches as the bikers terrorize Susan Vargas with gang-rape.	United States	

=== 1960–1969 ===
List
Year	Title	Character(s)	Actor	Notes	Country	Ref(s)
1961	The Children's Hour	Martha Dobie	Shirley MacLaine	Based on the 1934 play of the same name.	United States	
1961	Girls of the Night	Kameju	Chieko Naniwa	Kameju is a former prostitute in love with several women.	Japan	
1962	Walk on the Wild Side	Jo Courtney	Barbara Stanwyck	The owner and madam of New Orleans brothel the Doll House. Jo Courtney is the first conspicuous lesbian character in a Hollywood feature film. Stanwyck is the first Hollywood movie star to portray an overt lesbian in an American film.	United States	
1963	The Balcony	Madame Irma	Shelley Winters	Madame Irma is the madam of a brothel where customers play out their erotic fantasies, oblivious to a revolution that is sweeping the country.	United States	
1963	From Russia with Love	Rosa Klebb	Lotte Lenya	Klebb is a former SMERSH colonel-turned-SPECTRE operative.	United Kingdom	
1963	The Haunting	Theodora "Theo"	Claire Bloom	One of the few Hollywood films of its day to depict a lesbian as feminine and not predatory. Based on The Haunting of Hill House (1959) by Shirley Jackson, the character's lesbianism is more explicit compared to the novel.	United States, United Kingdom	
1964	Goldfinger	Pussy Galore	Honor Blackman	Although her sexual orientation is not explicit, hints are made in the dialogue. When Bond is flirting with her in one scene, she tells him "You can turn off the charm. I'm immune." In another scene he asks her "What would it take for you to see things my way?" and she replies "A lot more than you've got."	United Kingdom, United States	
1964	The Night of the Iguana	Judith Fellowes	Grayson Hall	Fellowes is Charlotte's chaperone.	United States	
1964	Manji	Sonoko Kakiuchi	Kyōko Kishida	Sonoko, a bored married woman, falls for fellow art student Mitsuko. The development of their relationship begins to affect and involve their other partners. Based on a 1928 novel by Jun'ichirō Tanizaki (there are four additional film versions of the same story).	Japan	
1964	Manji	Mitsuko Tokumitsu	Ayako Wakao	Sonoko, a bored married woman, falls for fellow art student Mitsuko. The development of their relationship begins to affect and involve their other partners. Based on a 1928 novel by Jun'ichirō Tanizaki (there are four additional film versions of the same story).	Japan	
1965	With Beauty and Sorrow	Sakami Keiko	Mariko Kaga	Otoko is a painter. Keiko is her apprentice. Based on the 1928 novel by Yasunari Kawabata.	Japan	
1965	With Beauty and Sorrow	Ueno Otoko	Kaoru Yachigusa	Otoko is a painter. Keiko is her apprentice. Based on the 1928 novel by Yasunari Kawabata.	Japan	
1965	Sylvia	Irma Olanski	Viveca Lindfors	Irma is a librarian.	United States	
1965	Who Killed Teddy Bear	Marian Freeman	Elaine Stritch	Marian is the older, experienced manager of the discotheque.	United States	
1966	7 Women	Agatha Andrews	Margaret Leighton	Agatha is Head of Mission.	United States	
1966	The Group	Elinor "Lakey" Eastlake	Candice Bergen	Lakey is regarded as the leader of the devoted women friends.	United States	
1967	The Fox	Jill Banford	Sandy Dennis	Jill tends to household chores and finances of the farm, while her intimate roommate, Ellen (bisexual), does the manual labor.	United States, Canada	
1967	Tony Rome	Irene	Elisabeth Fraser	Fraser's character Irene is misidentified as "Irma" in credits.	United States	
1968	Barbarella	The Great Tyrant	Anita Pallenberg	The Black Queen is the Great Tyrant of Sogo, a city located on Tau Ceti's 16th planet.	United States	
1968	Flesh	Geri	Geraldine Smith	Geri is in a marriage with Joe, a hustler and heroin addict. She's in a relationship with Patti.	United States	
1968	Flesh	Patti	Patti D'Arbanville	Geri is in a marriage with Joe, a hustler and heroin addict. She's in a relationship with Patti.	United States	
1968	The Killing of Sister George	June Buckridge	Beryl Reid	June is an ageing television actress.	United States	
1968	The Legend of Lylah Clare	Rossella	Rossella Falk	Rossella is an acting coach.	United States	
1968	Rachel, Rachel	Calla Mackie	Estelle Parsons	Calla, an extroverted schoolteacher, has a crush on her best friend Rachel. (Parsons was nominated for the 1969 Academy Award for Best Supporting Actress.)	United States	
1968	Therese and Isabelle	Thérèse	Essy Persson	Thérèse and Isabelle grow up together and share affectionate intimacies in a Swiss boarding school for girls.	United States	
1968	Therese and Isabelle	Isabelle	Anna Gaël	Thérèse and Isabelle grow up together and share affectionate intimacies in a Swiss boarding school for girls.	United States	

=== 1970–1979 ===
List
Year	Title	Character(s)	Actor	Notes	Country	Ref(s)
1970	Beyond the Valley of the Dolls	Casey Anderson	Cynthia Myers	Casey, the daughter of a United States Senator, performs in a rock band, The Kelly Affair. Roxanne is a fashion designer.	United States	
1970	Beyond the Valley of the Dolls	Roxanne	Erica Gavin	Casey, the daughter of a United States Senator, performs in a rock band, The Kelly Affair. Roxanne is a fashion designer.	United States	
1970	Five Easy Pieces	Terry Grouse	Toni Basil	Terry and Palm are two stranded women headed for Alaska.	United States	
1970	Five Easy Pieces	Palm Apodaca	Helena Kallianiotes	Terry and Palm are two stranded women headed for Alaska.	United States	
1970	Puzzle of a Downfall Child	Pauline Galba	Viveca Lindfors	Pauline is a sophisticated fashion designer.	United States	
1970	The Vampire Lovers	Carmilla Karnstein	Ingrid Pitt	She has romantic feelings for Emma who lets her dress her.	United Kingdom	
1971	Daughters of Darkness	Countess Bathory	Delphine Seyrig	Bathory is a countess who has a loyal servant named Ilona and tries to seduce a woman named Valerie.	Belgium	
1971	Vampyros Lesbos	Countess Nadine Carody	Soledad Miranda	Nadine inherited Count Dracula's estate.	West Germany, Spain	
1972	Heat	Jessica	Andrea Feldman	Jessica is Sally's psychotic daughter.	United States	
1972	They Only Kill Their Masters	Mrs. Watkins	June Allyson	Mrs. Watkins is married but holds a secret that she murdered her ex-lover, Jenny. Watkins' husband helped her in covering up the crime.	United States	
1973	Cleopatra Jones	Mommy	Shelley Winters	"Mommy" is the gang leader.	United States	
1974	Caged Heat	Superintendent McQueen	Barbara Steele	Superintendent McQueen is the deeply closeted prison guard.	United States	
1974	Once Upon a Time in the East	Hélène	Denise Filiatrault	A young teenager gets pregnant. However, she must find a way to secretly abort her child.	Canada	
1975	Cleopatra Jones and the Casino of Gold	Dragon Lady	Stella Stevens	Dragon Lady opens a casino, which, is actually the headquarters for her underground drug empire.	United States	
1975	Farewell, My Lovely	Frances Amthor	Kate Murtagh	Frances is a notorious madam.	United States	
1975	Once Is Not Enough	Deidre Milford Granger	Alexis Smith	Granger is one of the world's wealthiest women. She has already been through multiple marriages and demands that things be done her way. She is also secretly carrying on a same-sex affair.	United States	
1975	Once Is Not Enough	Karla	Melina Mercouri	Granger is one of the world's wealthiest women. She has already been through multiple marriages and demands that things be done her way. She is also secretly carrying on a same-sex affair.	United States	
1975	The Wild Party	Madeline True	Jennifer Lee	Madeline is the sensual friend of Queenie and Burrs.	United States	
1977	Desperate Living	Muffy St. Jacques	Liz Renay	Muffy is the lover of butch Mole.	United States	
1977	Desperate Living	Grizelda Brown	Jean Hill	Muffy is the lover of butch Mole.	United States	
1977	Prey	Josephine	Sally Faulkner	Reclusive, possessive Josephine is the girlfriend of Jessica-Ann (bisexual). They encounter a carnivorous alien.	United Kingdom	
1978	A Different Story	Stella Cooke	Meg Foster	A gay man and a lesbian who become temporary housemates end up falling in love with each other. Film critic Janet Maslin's original review elaborates: "The movie's use of [Albert and Stella's] homosexuality is indeed exploitative, insensitive, and offensive in a variety of ways. Even worse, it is unconvincing."	United States	
1978	A Wedding	Rita Billingsley	Geraldine Chaplin	Rita is a wedding planner who develops feelings for a bride she is assisting.	United States	
1979	A Perfect Couple	Mary	Heather MacRae	Mary and Sydney are a happy and well-adjusted couple in Shelia's band.	United States	
1979	A Perfect Couple	Sydney Ray	Tomi-Lee Bradley	Mary and Sydney are a happy and well-adjusted couple in Shelia's band.	United States	
1979	The Bell Jar	Joan	Donna Mitchell	Joan attempts to convince Esther to agree to a suicide pact, an incident that is not in the book.	United States	
1979	Manhattan	Connie	Karen Ludwig	Connie is the lover of Isaac's ex-wife, Jill.	United States	
1979	The Rose	Sarah Willingham	Sandra McCabe	Sarah is a former lover of Mary.	United States	
1979	To Forget Venice	Anna	Mariangela Melato	Anna is a distant relative of Marta's.	Italy	
1979	A Woman Like Eve	Eve	Monique van de Ven	While on holiday in France, Eve is irresistibly drawn to a young feminist and commune-dweller, Liliane.	Netherlands	
1979	A Woman Like Eve	Liliane	Maria Schneider	While on holiday in France, Eve is irresistibly drawn to a young feminist and commune-dweller, Liliane.	Netherlands	

=== 1980–1989 ===
List
Year	Title	Character(s)	Actor	Notes	Country	Ref(s)
1980	American Gigolo	Anne	Nina van Pallandt	Anne is Julian's procurer.	United States	
1980	The Last Metro	Arlette Guillaume	Andréa Ferréol	Arlette is a production designer.	France	
1980	Pepi, Luci, Bom and Other Girls on the Heap	Bom	Alaska	Bom is a punk rocker.	Spain	
1980	Times Square	Nicky Marotta	Robin Johnson	Nicky is being examined for mental illness.	United States	
1980	Windows	Andrea Glassen	Elizabeth Ashley	Andrea is a psychotic neighbor of Emily, who she is obsessed with. (Film critics and gay rights groups criticized the film for what they considered to be an offensive portrayal of lesbians.)	United States	
1982	Another Way	Éva Szalánczky	Jadwiga Jankowska-Cieślak	Éva, a newspaper reporter who is openly critical of socialism, does not conceal her sexuality. She falls in love with Livia, a co-worker married to an army officer. This is the first Hungarian film to feature a positive portrayal of homosexual love.	Hungary	
1982	By Design	Helen	Patty Duke	Helen and Angie are lovers who ask their co-worker to father them a child.	Canada	
1982	By Design	Angie	Sara Botsford	Helen and Angie are lovers who ask their co-worker to father them a child.	Canada	
1982	Personal Best	Chris Cahill	Mariel Hemingway	Chris and Tory fall in love while training for the Olympics.	United States	
1982	Personal Best	Tory Skinner	Patrice Donnelly	Chris and Tory fall in love while training for the Olympics.	United States	
1982	Tenebrae	Tilde	Mirella D'Angelo	Tilde is a feminist journalist.	Italy	
1983	Lianna	Lianna	Linda Griffiths	Lianna has a crush on Ruth and comes out after she has an affair with her. Ruth is a child psychology professor at the college.	United States	
1983	Lianna	Ruth	Jane Hallaren	Lianna has a crush on Ruth and comes out after she has an affair with her. Ruth is a child psychology professor at the college.	United States	
1983	Silkwood	Dolly Pelliker	Cher	Dolly is a friend of Karen Silkwood.	United States	
1984	Angel	Solly Mosler	Susan Tyrrell	Solly is an eccentric painter.	United States	
1984	The Bostonians	Olive Chancellor	Vanessa Redgrave	Chancellor is a Back Bay Boston spinster and leader of the women's suffrage movement, who becomes enamored of Verena Tarrant, an inspirational young speaker, and adopts Verena as her protégée, her friend, and her companion.	United Kingdom, United States	
1984	Fear City	Leila	Rae Dawn Chong	Leila is an exotic dancer. She is attacked and fatally injured by the stalker.	United States	
1985	Avenging Angel	Solly Mosler	Susan Tyrrell	Solly is a landlord and has a foul mouth. (The film is a sequel to Angel.)	United States	
1985	Desert Hearts	Vivian Bell	Helen Shaver	Vivian, a professor from Columbia University, goes to Reno, Nevada to await her divorce. She meets Cay, a free-spirited woman who does not hide her sexual orientation. Vivian begins to discover her true nature as she and Cay grow closer.	United States	
1985	Desert Hearts	Cay Rivers	Patricia Charbonneau	Vivian, a professor from Columbia University, goes to Reno, Nevada to await her divorce. She meets Cay, a free-spirited woman who does not hide her sexual orientation. Vivian begins to discover her true nature as she and Cay grow closer.	United States	
1985	The Good Father	Cheryl Langford	Frances Viner	Cheryl leaves her husband for a woman.	United Kingdom	
1985	November Moon	November Messing	Gabriele Osburg	November is Jewish and fled to Paris in 1939 to escape Nazi Germany. She meets Férial, a gentile, and they fall in love. When Germany invades France, November flees to the south, and Férial goes to work at a Nazi newspaper so that she can learn about plans by the Nazi occupiers and protect November from the Gestapo.	West Germany, France	
1985	November Moon	Férial	Christiane Millet	November is Jewish and fled to Paris in 1939 to escape Nazi Germany. She meets Férial, a gentile, and they fall in love. When Germany invades France, November flees to the south, and Férial goes to work at a Nazi newspaper so that she can learn about plans by the Nazi occupiers and protect November from the Gestapo.	West Germany, France	
1985	Outside the Walls (Extramuros)	sor Ana	Carmen Maura	Ana and Ángela are lovers and nuns in the same convent.	Spain	
1985	Outside the Walls (Extramuros)	sor Ángela	Mercedes Sampietro	Ana and Ángela are lovers and nuns in the same convent.	Spain	
1985	Red Sonja	Queen Gedren of Berkubane	Sandahl Bergman	Gedren is a sorceress. She murdered Sonja's parents and brother after she rejected Gedren's sexual overtures.	United States	
1985	To Live and Die in L.A.	Serena	Jane Leeves	Serena is Bianca's girlfriend.	United States	
1986	Anne Trister	Anne	Albane Guilhe	Anne is a Swiss Jewish artist who is grieving her father, moves to Montreal and forms a friendship with a child psychiatrist.	Canada	
1986	Mona Lisa	Simone	Cathy Tyson	Simone is a prostitute searching for a missing woman, who she was in love with.	United Kingdom	
1986	Reform School Girls	Charlie Chambliss	Wendy O. Williams	Charlie is the villainous leader of the reform school.	United States	
1986	She's Gotta Have It	Opal Gilstrap	Raye Dowell	Opal is Nola's friend who believes every person is capable of sexual fluidity.	United States	
1986	Working Girls	Molly	Louise Smith	Molly, a Yale University graduate, works in a New York City brothel to support herself and her girlfriend, Diane.	United States	
1986	Working Girls	Diane	Deborah Banks	Molly, a Yale University graduate, works in a New York City brothel to support herself and her girlfriend, Diane.	United States	
1987	Sammy and Rosie Get Laid	Vivia	Suzette Llewellyn	Vivia and Rani are an interracial couple and friends of Rosie. They discover evidence of Rafi's involvement in the torture and murder of political dissenters in Pakistan.	United Kingdom	
1987	Sammy and Rosie Get Laid	Rani	Meera Syal	Vivia and Rani are an interracial couple and friends of Rosie. They discover evidence of Rafi's involvement in the torture and murder of political dissenters in Pakistan.	United Kingdom	
1987	Slam Dance	Bobby Nye	Millie Perkins	Bobby is the former lover of murdered call girl Yolanda. She hires a hitman to kill Drood, who was Yolanda's married lover.	United Kingdom, United States	
1988	Arizona Heat	Jill Andrews	Denise Crosby	Jill is a detective trying to catch a serial killer who is murdering police officers.	United States	
1989	Full Moon in New York	Lee Fung-jiau	Maggie Cheung	Fung-jiau is the closeted owner of a Chinese restaurant.	United States, Hong Kong	

=== 1990–1999 ===
List
Year	Title	Character(s)	Actor	Notes	Country	Ref(s)
1990	The Handmaid's Tale	Moira	Elizabeth McGovern	Moira's motivation to become a rebel is particularly strong because she is a "gender traitor," i.e., a lesbian, in the dystopian society she lives in.	United States, West Germany	
1991	The Butcher's Wife	Grace	Frances McDormand	Grace is a dress shop clerk.	United States	
1991	Double Impact	Kara	Corinna Everson	Kara is Griffith's bodyguard.	United States	
1991	Fried Green Tomatoes	Idgie Threadgoode	Mary Stuart Masterson	Idgie has always loved Ruth. Ruth had a previous relationship with Buddy Threadgoode, Idgie's brother, before she married and had a child with another man. After Idgie rescues Ruth from her abusive husband, the romantic relationship between the two women begins. Based on the novel Fried Green Tomatoes at the Whistle Stop Cafe, where the relationship between Idgie and Ruth is not explicitly identified as a lesbian relationship, but every resident knows about them and accepts their relationship.	United States	
1991	Switch	Sheila Faxton	Lorraine Bracco	A cosmetics magnate. She responds to Amanda Brooks' seduction and takes her to a lesbian nightclub. Sheila was in a 10-year relationship with Kathleen Seymour, a perfumer at Faxton Cosmetics. The cutting of the sex scene between Sheila and Amanda was criticized by Ellen Barkin (Amanda).	United States	
1991	The Unborn	Connie	Kathy Griffin	Connie runs a Lamaze class.	United States	
1992	Basic Instinct	Roxy Hardy	Leilani Sarelle	Roxy is a murderer.	France, United States, United Kingdom	
1992	Belle Époque	Violeta	Ariadna Gil	Closeted Violeta, dressed as a soldier, plays sexually with Fernando after seeing him costumed as a maid at the carnaval party. Later, she tells him that what happened between them meant nothing.	Spain, France, Portugal	
1992	The Days of Being Dumb	Jane	Anita Yuen	Jane is a prostitute from Singapore.	Hong Kong	
1992	Gigolo and Whore II	Sherin Chan	Rosamund Kwan	Sherin is a rich and beautiful lady who has acquired the family business of Johnson, and he tried to change her into a man-loving heterosexual.	Hong Kong	
1992	Inside Monkey Zetterland	Grace	Patricia Arquette	Grace is Monkey's sister.	United States	
1992	Inside Monkey Zetterland	Cindy	Sofia Coppola	Grace is Monkey's sister.	United States	
1992	The Living End	Daisy	Mary Woronov	Daisy and Fern are serial killers.	United States	
1992	The Living End	Fern	Johanna Went	Daisy and Fern are serial killers.	United States	
1992	Naked Killer	Princess	Carrie Ng	Princess and Baby are lovers and assassins hired by the Yakuza. Sister Cindy mentors women to be assassins.	Hong Kong	
1992	Naked Killer	Baby	Madoka Sugawara	Princess and Baby are lovers and assassins hired by the Yakuza. Sister Cindy mentors women to be assassins.	Hong Kong	
1992	Naked Killer	Sister Cindy	Yiu Wai (Kelly Yao)	Princess and Baby are lovers and assassins hired by the Yakuza. Sister Cindy mentors women to be assassins.	Hong Kong	
1992	Poison Ivy	Sylvie Cooper	Sara Gilbert	Sylvie is a young girl at a private school for the wealthy.	United States	
1993	Even Cowgirls Get the Blues	Sissy Hankshaw	Uma Thurman	Sissy has a love affair with Bonanza, the ranch leader.	United States	
1993	Even Cowgirls Get the Blues	Bonanza Jellybean	Rain Phoenix	Sissy has a love affair with Bonanza, the ranch leader.	United States	
1993	Fight Back to School III	Ching Man Ching	Kathy Chow Hoi-mei	Ching is the girlfriend of bisexual heiress Judy Tong Wong.	Hong Kong	
1993	Three of Hearts	Connie Czapski	Kelly Lynch	Connie is Joe's best friend.	United States	
1994	Go Fish	Camille 'Max' West	Guinevere Turner	Camille is a college student in Chicago who has gone ten months without having sex.	United States	
1994	Go Fish	Ely	V.S. Brodie	Camille is a college student in Chicago who has gone ten months without having sex.	United States	
1995	Antonia's Line	Danielle	Els Dottermans	When Danielle falls in love with Lara, she has a vision of her as the Venus by Botticelli.	Netherlands	
1995	Antonia's Line	Lara	Elsie de Brauw	When Danielle falls in love with Lara, she has a vision of her as the Venus by Botticelli.	Netherlands	
1995	Boys on the Side	Jane DeLuca	Whoopi Goldberg	Jane is a musician who recently broke-up with her girlfriend and her band, decides to move from New York City to Los Angeles.	United States	
1995	The Brady Bunch Movie	Noreen	Alanna Ubach	Noreen had a crush on Marcia.	United States	
1995	French Twist	Marie-Jo	Josiane Balasko	Marie-Jo is a campervan driver.	France	
1995	Higher Learning	Taryn	Jennifer Connelly	Taryn is a junior student at Columbus University and the head of feminist activist group Students for a Non-Sexist Society. She has a relationship with Kristen Connor, unaware that Kristen is also involved with Wayne. (The sex scene between Taryn and Kristen was deleted from the U.S. theatrical release and the subsequent DVD. The scene was not censored in the United Kingdom and Australia film releases, as well as in the regions 2 and 4 DVDs.)	United States	
1995	The Incredibly True Adventure of Two Girls in Love	Randy Dean	Laurel Holloman	Randy is a 17-year-old student in her final school year with poor grades.	United States	
1995	The Incredibly True Adventure of Two Girls in Love	Evie Roy	Nicole Ari Parker	Randy is a 17-year-old student in her final school year with poor grades.	United States	
1995	When Night Is Falling	Camille Baker	Pascale Bussières	Camille is a mythology professor at a religious college and engaged to theology professor Martin. When her terrier, Bob, dies she realizes that she loved her dog more than she loves Martin. Petra is a circus performer.	Canada	
1995	When Night Is Falling	Petra Soft	Rachael Crawford	Camille is a mythology professor at a religious college and engaged to theology professor Martin. When her terrier, Bob, dies she realizes that she loved her dog more than she loves Martin. Petra is a circus performer.	Canada	
1995	Wild Side	Alex Lee	Anne Heche	Alex is a California banker.	United Kingdom, United States	
1996	Bound	Corky	Gina Gershon	Ex-con Corky enters into an affair with the girlfriend of a mafioso, and the two women hatch a scheme to steal $2 million of Mafia money.	United States	
1996	Citizen Ruth	Diane Siegler	Swoosie Kurtz	Diane is a pro-choice spy working within the ranks of the "Baby Savers". Rachel is Diane's partner.	United States	
1996	Citizen Ruth	Rachel	Kelly Preston	Diane is a pro-choice spy working within the ranks of the "Baby Savers". Rachel is Diane's partner.	United States	
1996	Eye for an Eye	Angel Kosinsky	Charlayne Woodard	Angel is a FBI Agent.	United States	
1996	Fire	Sita	Nandita Das	The first mainstream Indian film to feature a lesbian relationship and one of the first to show homosexual love.	India, Canada	
1996	Fire	Radha	Shabana Azmi	The first mainstream Indian film to feature a lesbian relationship and one of the first to show homosexual love.	India, Canada	
1996	The First Wives Club	Christine Paradis	Jennifer Dundas	Christine is Annie's feminist daughter.	United States	
1996	Freeway	Rhonda	Brittany Murphy	Rhonda is a heroin addict.	United States	
1996	Grace of My Heart	Kelly Porter	Bridget Fonda	Pop singer Porter is in a closeted relationship with her roommate Marion. After one of her songwriters overhears Porter on the phone with her secret lover, the coded song "My Secret Love" is written for her and it becomes a solid-gold hit. (The character is alleged to have been partially inspired by singer Lesley Gore, who co-wrote "My Secret Love" for the film.)	United States	
1996	Grace of My Heart	Marion	Lucinda Jenney	Pop singer Porter is in a closeted relationship with her roommate Marion. After one of her songwriters overhears Porter on the phone with her secret lover, the coded song "My Secret Love" is written for her and it becomes a solid-gold hit. (The character is alleged to have been partially inspired by singer Lesley Gore, who co-wrote "My Secret Love" for the film.)	United States	
1996	How to Meet the Lucky Stars	Sheung Kung Fei Fa	Kung Suet-Fa	Suet-Fa is a notorious gambler.	Hong Kong	
1996	Losing Chase	Chase Phillips	Helen Mirren	Chase is in an unhappy marriage. After returning home from treatment for a nervous breakdown, a helper, Elizabeth, is hired to assist her. She initially resists Elizabeth's presence, but as time passes she begins to appreciate her and a friendship grows between them. Chase eventually confesses to Elizabeth that she is in love with her and kisses her, but Elizabeth cannot return the same attraction. Afterwards, Chase leaves her husband.	United States	
1996	Love and Other Catastrophes	Mia	Frances O'Connor	Mia is a film studies student.	Australia	
1996	Love and Other Catastrophes	Danni	Radha Mitchell	Mia is a film studies student.	Australia	
1996	Set It Off	Cleopatra "Cleo" Sims	Queen Latifah	Cleo has prior convictions and works as a janitor.	United States	
1996	The Watermelon Woman	Cheryl	Cheryl Dunye	Cheryl works at a video rental store. She falls in love with Diana and has sex with her. (Their sex scene was described by a critic as "the hottest dyke sex scene ever recorded on celluloid"). Tamara is a Black co-worker at the video store. She is critical of Cheryl for having a White girlfriend. Diana flirts with Cheryl in the store. She later enters into a romantic relationship with her. Shirley is a friend of Cheryl's mother and helps Cheryl with her project about "The Watermelon Woman". Fae is an actress credited as "The Watermelon Woman" in the 1930s film "Plantation Memories" that Cheryl discovers. It is later revealed that she was in a relationship with film director Martha Page. June is the "special friend" of Fae, with whom she had a romantic relationship for over 20 years.	United States	
1996	The Watermelon Woman	Tamara	Valerie Walker		United States	
1996	The Watermelon Woman	Diana	Guinevere Turner		United States	
1996	The Watermelon Woman	Shirley Hamilton	Ira Jeffries		United States	
1996	The Watermelon Woman	Fae Richards	Lisa Maria Bronson		United States	
1996	The Watermelon Woman	Martha Page	Alexandra Juhasz		United States	
1996	The Watermelon Woman	June Walker	Cheryl Clarke		United States	
1997	All Over Me	Claude	Alison Folland	Claude is a tomboy teenage girl who lives with her divorced mother in Hell's Kitchen.	United States	
1997	All Over Me	Lucy	Leisha Hailey	Claude is a tomboy teenage girl who lives with her divorced mother in Hell's Kitchen.	United States	
1997	Chasing Amy	Alyssa Jones	Joey Lauren Adams	Alyssa is a comic book artist.	United States	
1997	First Love Unlimited	Hong's sister	Erica Yuen Lai-Ming	Hogn's sister is depicted as a homosexual.	Hong Kong	
1997	Little City	Kate	Joanna Going	After meeting Anne, Kate comes out and leaves her husband, then comes out to her parents. After Anne breaks up with her, she decides to become pregnant and to do so tries to renew her relationship with her estranged husband, but realizes she is only attracted to women. Anne is an art teacher. She does not want to be monogamous and breaks up with Kate.	United States	
1997	Little City	Anne	JoBeth Williams	After meeting Anne, Kate comes out and leaves her husband, then comes out to her parents. After Anne breaks up with her, she decides to become pregnant and to do so tries to renew her relationship with her estranged husband, but realizes she is only attracted to women. Anne is an art teacher. She does not want to be monogamous and breaks up with Kate.	United States	
1998	Edge of Seventeen	Angie	Lea DeLaria	Angie is a manager at the amusement park.	United States	
1998	High Art	Lucy Berliner	Ally Sheedy	Lucy is a renowned photographer. She lives with her girlfriend Greta, a heroin-addicted former actress.	Canada, United States	
1998	High Art	Greta	Patricia Clarkson	Lucy is a renowned photographer. She lives with her girlfriend Greta, a heroin-addicted former actress.	Canada, United States	
1998	Portland Street Blues	Sister Thirteen	Sandra Ng	Thirteen is a mobster and branch leader of the Hung Hing triad.	China (Hong Kong)	
1998	Primary Colors	Libby Holden	Kathy Bates	Holden is Stantons' tough but unbalanced old friend.	United States	
1998	Show Me Love	Agnes Ahlberg	Rebecka Liljeberg	Agnes attends school in Åmål, a small Swedish town.	Sweden	
1998	Your Friends & Neighbors	Cheri	Nastassja Kinski	Cheri works in a local art gallery.	United States	
1999	Aimée & Jaguar	Lilly Wust (Aimée)	Juliane Köhler	Aimée (real name Lilly) is in love with Felice, but married to a Nazi. Felice is Jewish and a member of the underground resistance, known by the name "Jaguar".	Germany	
1999	Aimée & Jaguar	Felice Schragenheim (Jaguar)	Maria Schrader	Aimée (real name Lilly) is in love with Felice, but married to a Nazi. Felice is Jewish and a member of the underground resistance, known by the name "Jaguar".	Germany	
1999	All About My Mother	Huma Rojo	Marisa Paredes	Huma is an actress involved with Nina, who later runs off.	Spain	
1999	Being John Malkovich	Lotte Schwartz	Cameron Diaz	Lotte is an unhappily married and confused person, and one of multiple people whose mind temporarily enters the mind of John Malkovich through a portal. Lotte becomes more confident in Malkovitch's body, enjoying how she feels. Lotte (not in John's body anymore) and Maxine end together as a couple raising their daughter, Emily.	United States	
1999	Better Than Chocolate	Francis	Ann-Marie MacDonald	Frances is a lesbian separatist who owns a bookstore. Maggie is in a relationship with Kim.	Canada	
1999	Better Than Chocolate	Maggie	Karyn Dwyer	Frances is a lesbian separatist who owns a bookstore. Maggie is in a relationship with Kim.	Canada	
1999	Better Than Chocolate	Kim	Christina Cox	Frances is a lesbian separatist who owns a bookstore. Maggie is in a relationship with Kim.	Canada	
1999	But I'm a Cheerleader	Megan Bloomfield	Natasha Lyonne	Megan is the 17-year-old protagonist. Her parents send her to True Directions, a conversion therapy camp that aims to convert its campers to heterosexuality. She eventually meets Graham, another camper at True Directions. Graham starts a relationship with Megan, with both having sex. Sinead and Hilary are campers. In the True Directions orientation video which depicts homosexuality as a problem to be "fixed", Kelly is a girl shown to be a lesbian until "cured" by the organization. The lipstick lesbian character makes a brief cameo and is referred to as "Lipstick Lesbian" in the film's credits.	United States	
1999	But I'm a Cheerleader	Graham Eaton	Clea DuVall		United States	
1999	But I'm a Cheerleader	Sinead Laren	Katharine Towne		United States	
1999	But I'm a Cheerleader	Hilary Vandermuller	Melanie Lynskey		United States	
1999	But I'm a Cheerleader	Kelly	Ione Skye (uncredited)		United States	
1999	But I'm a Cheerleader	Lipstick Lesbian	Julie Delpy		United States	
1999	The Deep End of the Ocean	Candace "Candy" Bliss	Whoopi Goldberg	Candy is a detective investigating the disappearance of Ben.	United States	
1999	Election	Tammy Metzler	Jessica Campbell	Tammy is closeted. Early in the film she is dumped by her girlfriend, Lisa Flanagan, for her brother. She later runs a nihilistic campaign for class president with the intent to dismantle the student government, and get revenge on her brother. She falsely confesses to ripping down campaign posters, resulting in her expulsion and transfer to a Catholic girls school. Her story ends happily, as she meets her next love, Jennifer, at the school. (Early on in the film, Tammy gives a narration where she says, "it's not like I'm a lesbian or anything, I'm attracted to the person. It's just that all the people I've ever been attracted to happen to be girls.")	United States	
1999	Limbo	Frankie	Kathryn Grody	Frankie and Lou are a couple and businesswomen.	United States	
1999	Limbo	Lou	Rita Taggart	Frankie and Lou are a couple and businesswomen.	United States	
1999	Memento Mori	Min Hyo-shin	Park Ye-jin	Seo Min-ah finds a secret diary kept by high school students Min Hyo-shin and Yoo Shi-eun, who were lovers even though their relationship was considered forbidden. Shunned and condemned by classmates and teachers, the societal pressure causes Shi-Eun to distance herself from Hyo-shin. A despondent Hyo-shin sees it as rejection and betrayal, and commits suicide. Her ghost then haunts the school, possesses Min-ah, and terrorizes the bullies at the all-girls school. Memento Mori is one of the first South Korean films to feature a lesbian relationship.	South Korea	
1999	Memento Mori	Yoo Shi-eun	Lee Young-jin		South Korea	
1999	Tea with Mussolini	Georgina 'Georgie' Rockwell	Lily Tomlin	Georgina is an archeologist.	United Kingdom, Italy	
1999	Tempting Heart	Chen-Li	Karen Mok	Chen-Li is Xiao-rou's best friend, whom Xiao-rou confides in.	Hong Kong	
1999	Why Not Me?	Camille	Amira Casar	The movie is about three out friends in Barcelona.	France, Spain, Switzerland	
1999	Why Not Me?	Ariane	Alexandra London	The movie is about three out friends in Barcelona.	France, Spain, Switzerland	
1999	Why Not Me?	Eva	Julie Gayet	The movie is about three out friends in Barcelona.	France, Spain, Switzerland	

== 21st century ==
=== 2000–2004 ===
List
Year	Title	Character(s)	Actor	Notes	Country	Ref(s)
2000	Best in Show	Christy Cummings	Jane Lynch	Christy is an extremely competitive butch and romantically involved with Sherri Ann.	United States	
2000	Best in Show	Sherri Ann Ward Cabot	Jennifer Coolidge	Christy is an extremely competitive butch and romantically involved with Sherri Ann.	United States	
2000	Dr. T & the Women	Dee Dee Travis	Kate Hudson	Dee Dee is Dr. T's closeted daughter who is in a secret relationship with Marilyn.	United States, Germany	
2000	Dr. T & the Women	Marilyn	Liv Tyler	Dee Dee is Dr. T's closeted daughter who is in a secret relationship with Marilyn.	United States, Germany	
2000	Miss Congeniality	Karen Krantz (Miss New York)	Melissa De Sousa	Krantz professes her love for Tina Texas.	United States	
2000	Sordid Lives	Bitsy Mae Harling	Olivia Newton-John	Bitsy is an ex-con, and honky-tonk singer and guitar player.	United States	
2000	Spacked Out	Sissy	Christy Cheung	Sissy and Bean Curd are a couple.	Hong Kong	
2000	Spacked Out	Bean Curd	Maggie Poon	Sissy and Bean Curd are a couple.	Hong Kong	
2000	Things You Can Tell Just by Looking at Her	Lilly	Valeria Golino	Christine's partner Lilly is critically ill with an unnamed disease, possibly cancer.	United States	
2000	Things You Can Tell Just by Looking at Her	Christine Taylor	Calista Flockhart	Christine's partner Lilly is critically ill with an unnamed disease, possibly cancer.	United States	
2000	Time and Tide	Ah Jo	Cathy Tsui	Cathy is a policewoman.	Hong Kong	
2000	What's Cooking?	Carla	Julianna Margulies	Rachel is welcomed home, along with her girlfriend Carla on Thanksgiving day.	United Kingdom, United States	
2000	What's Cooking?	Rachel Seelig	Kyra Sedgwick	Rachel is welcomed home, along with her girlfriend Carla on Thanksgiving day.	United Kingdom, United States	
2001	Blow Dry	Sandra	Rachel Griffiths	Sandra operates a hairdressing shop with her domestic partner.	United States, United Kingdom, Germany	
2001	Jesus Christ Vampire Hunter	Mary Magnum	Mary Moulton	Mary becomes a vampire after being bitten by Shreck.	Canada	
2001	Jesus Christ Vampire Hunter	Maxine Shreck	Murielle Varhelyi	Mary becomes a vampire after being bitten by Shreck.	Canada	
2001	Lost and Delirious	Pauline Oster	Piper Perabo	Mary (nicknamed Mouse) is a new student at the all girls' boarding school, and dorms with Victoria (nicknamed Tori).	Canada	
2001	Lost and Delirious	Victoria "Tori" Moller	Jessica Paré	Mary (nicknamed Mouse) is a new student at the all girls' boarding school, and dorms with Victoria (nicknamed Tori).	Canada	
2001	Mulholland Drive	Betty Elms	Naomi Watts	Aspiring actress Betty meets and befriends Rita, who has amnesia after a car accident.	France, United States	
2001	Mulholland Drive	Rita	Laura Elena Harring	Aspiring actress Betty meets and befriends Rita, who has amnesia after a car accident.	France, United States	
2002	The Hours	Sally Lester	Allison Janney	Sally is in a long-term relationship with Clarissa, who pines for "a long-lost romance with Richard."	United Kingdom, United States	
2002	Kiss the Bride	Amy Kayne	Alyssa Milano	Toni is accompanied by her biker girlfriend Amy and long for the approval and love of their domineering father	United States	
2002	Kiss the Bride	Antonia "Toni" Sposato	Monet Mazur	Toni is accompanied by her biker girlfriend Amy and long for the approval and love of their domineering father	United States	
2002	May	Ambrosia	Nichole Hiltz	May's colleague Polly shows an interest in her, who later enters a relationship with another girl named Ambrosia.	United States	
2002	May	Polly	Anna Faris	May's colleague Polly shows an interest in her, who later enters a relationship with another girl named Ambrosia.	United States	
2002	Blue	Masami Endo	Manami Konishi	High school student Kayako falls in love with her classmate Masami. Based on the manga Blue by Kiriko Nananan.	Japan	
2002	Blue	Kayako Kirishima	Mikako Ichikawa	High school student Kayako falls in love with her classmate Masami. Based on the manga Blue by Kiriko Nananan.	Japan	
2003	Gigli	Ricki/Rochelle	Jennifer Lopez	Gigli and Ricki get to like each other, even though she makes it perfectly clear that she is a lesbian.	United States	
2003	Mona Lisa Smile	Amanda Armstrong	Juliet Stevenson	Armstrong is a campus nurse at Wellesley College who is terminated after she's exposed for supplying contraception (condoms) to the students.	United States	
2003	Monster	Aileen Wuornos	Charlize Theron	Biopic about Wuornos, a street prostitute who becomes a serial killer after being brutally raped and beaten by a john. Based on Wuornos's real-life girlfriend Tyria Moore, Selby is Wuornos' semi-fictionalized lover.	United States	
2003	Monster	Selby Wall	Christina Ricci	Biopic about Wuornos, a street prostitute who becomes a serial killer after being brutally raped and beaten by a john. Based on Wuornos's real-life girlfriend Tyria Moore, Selby is Wuornos' semi-fictionalized lover.	United States	
2003	Something's Gotta Give	Zoe	Frances McDormand	Erica's sister and feminist women's studies professor who disapproves of her sister's relationship with playboy socialite Harry Sanborn.	United States	
2003	Under the Tuscan Sun	Grace	Kate Walsh	Patti is Frances' best friend and is expecting a child with her partner Grace.	United States	
2003	Under the Tuscan Sun	Patti	Sandra Oh	Patti is Frances' best friend and is expecting a child with her partner Grace.	United States	
2004	Butterfly	Flavia	Josie Ho	Flavia is a married high school teacher, who meets a beautiful free-spirited female singer-songwriter named Yip and develops a relationship with the younger girl.	Hong Kong	
2004	Butterfly	Yip	Tian Yuan	Flavia is a married high school teacher, who meets a beautiful free-spirited female singer-songwriter named Yip and develops a relationship with the younger girl.	Hong Kong	
2004	D.E.B.S	Lucy Diamond	Jordana Brewster	Diamond is an infamous supercriminal, known for her operations, thefts, an alleged attempt to sink Australia, as well as supposedly killing every agent that goes up against her.	United States	
2004	Eulogy	Judy Arnolds	Famke Janssen	Lucy and her girlfriend Judy are criticized throughout the movie because of their relationship.	United States	
2004	Eulogy	Lucy Collins	Kelly Preston	Lucy and her girlfriend Judy are criticized throughout the movie because of their relationship.	United States	
2004	My Summer of Love	Tamsin	Emily Blunt	Tasin forms a romantic relationship with her partner despite their different classes and backgrounds.	United Kingdom	
2004	Saving Face	Willhelmina "Wil" Pang	Michelle Krusiec	Wil, a closeted hospital surgeon, falls in love with Vivian, but is afraid that her traditional Chinese family will find out her secret. Vivian, a ballet dancer, wants Wil to stop being afraid of what others may think about them.	United States	
2004	Saving Face	Vivian Shing	Lynn Chen	Wil, a closeted hospital surgeon, falls in love with Vivian, but is afraid that her traditional Chinese family will find out her secret. Vivian, a ballet dancer, wants Wil to stop being afraid of what others may think about them.	United States	
2004	She Hate Me	Fatima Goodrich	Kerry Washington	Fatima is Jack's ex-fiancée who came out and now wants a child.	United States	
2004	She Hate Me	Alex Guerrero	Dania Ramirez	Fatima is Jack's ex-fiancée who came out and now wants a child.	United States	

=== 2005–2009 ===
List
Year	Title	Character(s)	Actor	Notes	Country	Ref(s)
2005	Gypo	Tasha	Chloe Sirene	Tasha, a Romani refugee from Czechia, is the college schoolmate of Helen's daughter. She has an affair with Helen.	United Kingdom	
2005	Imagine Me & You	Luce	Lena Headey	Flower shop owner Luce enters a relationship with Rachel.	Germany, United Kingdom	
2005	Red Doors	Julie Wong	Elaine Kao	Julie is a fourth-year medical student who begins to question her life choices when she meets Mia Scarlett.	United States	
2005	Red Doors	Mia Scarlett	Mia Riverton	Julie is a fourth-year medical student who begins to question her life choices when she meets Mia Scarlett.	United States	
2005	Rent	Joanne Jefferson	Tracie Thoms	Joanne Jefferson is a Harvard-graduate lawyer and Maureen's love interest.	United States	
2005	Russian Dolls	Isabelle	Cécile de France	Isabelle, a financial expert and television commentator, helps her friend Xavier by posing as his fiancée.	France, United Kingdom	
2005	Sin City	Lucille	Carla Gugino	Lucille is Marv's parole officer.	United States	
2005	V for Vendetta	Valerie Page	Natasha Wightman	Valerie was sent to a detention facility for her lesbianism and then had medical experiments performed on her, reminiscent of the persecution of homosexuals in Nazi Germany and the Holocaust.	Germany, United Kingdom, United States	
2006	Bug	R.C.	Lynn Collins	R.C. is Agnes' friend and co-worker at the lesbian bar.	United States	
2006	Gray Matters	Gray Baldwin	Heather Graham	Gray is a family-oriented and quiet bachelorette, who lives a close-knit life with her brother, Sam.	United States	
2006	In Her Line of Fire	Lynn Delaney	Mariel Hemingway	Sergeant Major Delaney is a Secret Service agent guarding the VP of the United States. She's an ex-Marine and friend of the VP, and served with him during Operation Desert Storm. Lynn and Sharon fall for each other. Air Force Two, the alternate version of the film distributed outside of the United States, deleted all references to Delaney's lesbianism including the two kiss scenes between her and Sharon.	United States	
2006	In Her Line of Fire	Sharon Serrano	Jill Bennett	Sergeant Major Delaney is a Secret Service agent guarding the VP of the United States. She's an ex-Marine and friend of the VP, and served with him during Operation Desert Storm. Lynn and Sharon fall for each other. Air Force Two, the alternate version of the film distributed outside of the United States, deleted all references to Delaney's lesbianism including the two kiss scenes between her and Sharon.	United States	
2006	Loving Annabelle	Annabelle Tillman	Erin Kelly	Annabelle in an emotionally mature student that transfers to a strict Catholic boarding school in her senior high school year after being expelled from two previous schools. She falls in love with her poetry teacher, Simone. Simone is a closeted teacher who resists Annabelle's flirtations and advances, but falls in love with her. After the suicide of her lover, Amanda, she repressed her sexual orientation; and instead of dealing with the pain and loss, she uses a male teacher from another school as a beard.	United States	
2006	Loving Annabelle	Simone Bradley	Diane Gaidry		United States	
2006	Notes on a Scandal	Barbara Covett	Judi Dench	Covett is a closeted teacher.	United Kingdom	
2006	Smokin' Aces	Sharice Watters	Taraji P. Henson	Sharice and Georgia are partners and contract killers who work together on assignments.	United States, United Kingdom, France	
2006	Smokin' Aces	Georgia Sykes	Alicia Keys	Sharice and Georgia are partners and contract killers who work together on assignments.	United States, United Kingdom, France	
2006	Tell No One (Ne le dis à personne)	Anne Beck	Marina Hands	Anne and Hélène are married. Anne is Alex's sister.	France	
2006	Tell No One (Ne le dis à personne)	Hélène Perkins	Kristin Scott Thomas	Anne and Hélène are married. Anne is Alex's sister.	France	
2007	88 Minutes	Shelly Barnes	Amy Brenneman	Barnes is the assistant of forensic psychiatrist Jack Gramm.	United States, Canada, Germany	
2007	Across the Universe	Prudence	T.V. Carpio	Cheerleader Prudence is attracted to Sadie and becomes depressed when Sadie and Jo-Jo begin a relationship.	United Kingdom, United States	
2007	After Sex	Kat	Zoe Saldaña	Kat is a college student who admits to her roommate Nikki that she's a lesbian but hides it from her parents.	United States	
2007	Dolls	Iska	Marie Doležalová	After graduating from high school, Iska and her friends go on a trip where she develops an attraction to her friend Karolina, and hooks up with a much older woman named Hanka.	Czech Republic	
2007	Exhibit A	Judith King	Brittany Ashworth	Judith is a teenager who has not yet come out to her family. She has a crush on Claire, a girl who lives across the street, and uses her camcorder to secretly film her.	United Kingdom	
2007	Feast of Love	Jenny	Stana Katic	Jenny is a shortstop in a women's softball team and the woman that Kathryn leaves her husband for. (The film follows the love lives of several couples.)	United States	
2007	The Jane Austen Book Club	Allegra	Maggie Grace	Allegra is Sylvia's 20-something daughter.	United States	
2007	Planet Terror	Tammy Visan	Fergie (as Stacy Ferguson)	Tammy is the former lover of Dakota.	United States	
2007	Steam	Elizabeth	Kate Siegel	Elizabeth is a first-year college student who is beginning to understand her sexual orientation. She spends a night with a female classmate.	United States	
2007	Wild Chicks in Love (Die wilden Hühner und die Liebe)	Wilma	Jette Hering	Wilma falls in love with schoolmate Leonie. They begin a romantic relationship, which leads to an argument within Wilma's group of friends. At the end of the film, they separate.	Germany	
2007	Wild Chicks in Love (Die wilden Hühner und die Liebe)	Leonie	Svea Bein	Wilma falls in love with schoolmate Leonie. They begin a romantic relationship, which leads to an argument within Wilma's group of friends. At the end of the film, they separate.	Germany	
2007	Wrong Turn 2: Dead End	Amber Williams	Daniella Alonso	Williams is an Army war veteran and contestant in a survivalist reality television show. When Matt Jones is being obnoxious, she says to him: "You don't get it, do you? I'm not into men!"	United States	
2008	Dim Sum Funeral	Dede	Bai Ling	Dede and Meimei are a couple, who hope have a child, and they are on the lookout for a sperm donor.	United States, Canada	
2008	Dim Sum Funeral	Meimei	Steph Song	Dede and Meimei are a couple, who hope have a child, and they are on the lookout for a sperm donor.	United States, Canada	
2008	Jolene	Cindy	Frances Fisher	Cindy is a psychiatric nurse in the juvenile mental institution that Jolene's aunt placed the teenager in after her affair with her uncle in-law is discovered. They become lovers.	United States	
2008	Milk	Anne Kronenberg	Alison Pill	Kronenberg is Harvey Milk's campaign manager in his run for a seat on the Board of Supervisors.	United States	
2008	Sunshine Cleaning	Lynn	Mary Lynn Rajskub	Lynn is the daughter of a woman whose house Rose and Norah they cleaned. She was in arealtionship with Norah before breaking off.	United States	
2008	The Women	Alex Fish	Jada Pinkett Smith	Alex and Natasha are exes.	United States	
2008	The Women	Natasha	Natasha Alam	Alex and Natasha are exes.	United States	
2009	Boogie Woogie	Elaine	Jaime Winstone	Elaine is a video artist, who exploits everyone around her	United Kingdom	
2009	Cracks	Miss "G" Gribben	Eva Green	Miss G is the school's enigmatic diving instructor.	United Kingdom, Ireland	
2009	Cracks	Di Redfield	Juno Temple	Miss G is the school's enigmatic diving instructor.	United Kingdom, Ireland	
2009	I Am Love	Elisabetta Recchi	Alba Rohrwacher	Elisabetta is Edoardo Jr.'s young adult sibling.	Italy	
2009	Life Blood	Brooke Anchel	Sophie Monk	Brooke and Rhea are a couple. After Brooke kills a rapist, they are driving on the highway when Brooke disappears in a sudden sandstorm. A supernatural entity appears before Rhea and offers her immortality, but she refuses to spend eternity without Brooke, and Rhea dies. Forty years later, they both awaken from the dead and return to life as vampires.	United States	
2009	Life Blood	Rhea Cohen	Anya Lahiri	Brooke and Rhea are a couple. After Brooke kills a rapist, they are driving on the highway when Brooke disappears in a sudden sandstorm. A supernatural entity appears before Rhea and offers her immortality, but she refuses to spend eternity without Brooke, and Rhea dies. Forty years later, they both awaken from the dead and return to life as vampires.	United States	
2009	Miss March	Katja	Alexis Rabin	Katja and Vonka are an extremely libidinous couple who Eugene and Tucker met on their road trip to the Playboy Mansion.	United States	
2009	Miss March	Vonka	Eve Mauro	Katja and Vonka are an extremely libidinous couple who Eugene and Tucker met on their road trip to the Playboy Mansion.	United States	
2009	Precious	Ms. Blu Rain	Paula Patton	Ms. Rain is a teacher at the Reach One Teach One alternative school.	United States	
2009	The Private Lives of Pippa Lee	Trish	Robin Weigert	Trish is Pippa's aunt. Her girlfriend Kat is a photographer of erotica and S&M.	United States	
2009	The Private Lives of Pippa Lee	Kat	Julianne Moore	Trish is Pippa's aunt. Her girlfriend Kat is a photographer of erotica and S&M.	United States	

=== 2010–2014 ===
List
Year	Title	Character(s)	Actor	Notes	Country	Ref(s)
2010	Black Swan	Lily / Black Swan / Odile	Mila Kunis	Lily is Nina's new rival dancer.	United States	
2010	Kaboom	Lorelei	Roxane Mesquida	Stella is Smith's best friend, whom he has known since junior high. Stella hooks up with a girl named Lorelei, who Smith recognizes from one of his dreams.	United States	
2010	Kaboom	Stella	Haley Bennett	Stella is Smith's best friend, whom he has known since junior high. Stella hooks up with a girl named Lorelei, who Smith recognizes from one of his dreams.	United States	
2010	The Kids Are All Right	Nicole 'Nic' Allgood	Annette Bening	To conceive a child, Nic used the same sperm donor as Jules, her spouse. Their teenage son wants to find out about his biological father and his older sister helps him find the contact information, which leads to an unexpected turmoil in their marriage when Jules meets the father.	United States	
2010	Scott Pilgrim vs. the World	Roxanne "Roxy" Richter	Mae Whitman	Roxy was Ramona's college roommate.	United Kingdom, United States, Japan	
2010	Sex and the City 2	Erin	Alice Eve	Erin is the Irish nanny for Charlotte's child. They nicknamed her "Erin Go Braless".	United States	
2010	Tierra madre	Aidée	Aidée González	Based on Aidee Gonzalez's true life, when she lived on the Mexican border towns of Tecate and Tijuana, determined to raise her children with her female partner.	Mexico	
2010	Yes or No	Kim	Suppanad Jittaleela	Kim is the first butch character in a lesbian-related Thai film. Pie comes out after meeting Kim and getting to know her.	Thailand	
2010	Yes or No	Pie	Sushar Manaying	Kim is the first butch character in a lesbian-related Thai film. Pie comes out after meeting Kim and getting to know her.	Thailand	
2011	Cloudburst	Stella	Olympia Dukakis	Stella and Dot are an elderly couple in Maine who have been together for decades. Dot is in poor health and Stella has been taking care of her. The only one who is clueless that they are lesbians in a relationship is Dot's granddaughter. After she convinces the frail Dot to sign a power-of-attorney and relocate to an assisted living facility, Stella breaks into the home and she and Dot flee to Nova Scotia where same-sex marriage is legal.	Canada, United States	
2011	Cloudburst	Dot	Brenda Fricker	Stella and Dot are an elderly couple in Maine who have been together for decades. Dot is in poor health and Stella has been taking care of her. The only one who is clueless that they are lesbians in a relationship is Dot's granddaughter. After she convinces the frail Dot to sign a power-of-attorney and relocate to an assisted living facility, Stella breaks into the home and she and Dot flee to Nova Scotia where same-sex marriage is legal.	Canada, United States	
2011	Love Actually... Sucks!	Policewoman	Lareine Xu	One of the six real-life court cases shown is a role-playing lesbian couple.	Hong Kong	
2011	Love Actually... Sucks!	Policewoman's girl	Celia Chang	One of the six real-life court cases shown is a role-playing lesbian couple.	Hong Kong	
2011	Our Idiot Brother	Cindy Harris	Rashida Jones	Harris lives with her hipster girlfriend Natalie.	United States	
2011	Pariah	Alike	Adepero Oduye	Alike is a 17-year-old Black teenager embracing her identity as a lesbian.	United States	
2011	The Perfect Family	Shannon Cleary	Emily Deschanel	Shannon marries her girlfriend Angela, but her Catholic mother refuses to accept her.	United States	
2011	The Perfect Family	Angela Rayes	Angelique Cabral	Shannon marries her girlfriend Angela, but her Catholic mother refuses to accept her.	United States	
2011	The Skin I Live In	Cristina	Bárbara Lennie	Cristina is a salesgirl in the dress shop. Her co-worker, Vicente, was infatuated with her.	Spain	
2011	Swinging with the Finkels	Lesbian #1	Daisy Haggard		United Kingdom	
2011	Swinging with the Finkels	Lesbian #2	Amanda Abbington		United Kingdom	
2011	Your Sister's Sister	Hannah	Rosemarie DeWitt	Hannah has recently broken up with her partner and is staying at the cabin without her sister Iris's knowledge.	United States	
2011	Yuriko, Dasvidaniya	Yoshiko Yuasa	Nahana	Yoshiko is a magazine editor studying Russian when she meets novelist Miyamoto Yuriko (bisexual). They become close and enter into a romantic relationship. Yoshiko said of herself, "I fall in love with women just like men fall in love with women."	Japan	
2012	Jack & Diane	Diane	Juno Temple	Diane meets fellow teenager Jack, a skateboarding butch girl. Jack becomes instantly smitten by Diane. Jack takes Diane to a night club, where they kiss passionately.	United States	
2012	Jack & Diane	Jack	Riley Keough	Diane meets fellow teenager Jack, a skateboarding butch girl. Jack becomes instantly smitten by Diane. Jack takes Diane to a night club, where they kiss passionately.	United States	
2012	Love Is Not Perfect	Adriana	Lorena Cacciatore	Adriana is realizing her sexual orientation and preference for women.	Italy	
2013	Blue Is the Warmest Colour	Emma	Léa Seydoux	After her previous relationship ends, Emma enters into a relationship with Lise.	France	
2013	Blue Is the Warmest Colour	Lise	Mona Walravens	After her previous relationship ends, Emma enters into a relationship with Lise.	France	
2013	Chinese Puzzle	Isabelle	Cécile de France	Isabelle and Ju are a couple with a child. Isabelle later cheats on Ju with the young woman who babysits for them.	France, Belgium	
2013	Chinese Puzzle	Ju	Sandrine Holt	Isabelle and Ju are a couple with a child. Isabelle later cheats on Ju with the young woman who babysits for them.	France, Belgium	
2013	Concussion	Abby Ableman	Robin Weigert	Abby and Kate are a married couple. Unbeknownst to Kate, Abby prostitutes herself to numerous women.	United States	
2013	Concussion	Kate	Julie Fain Lawrence	Abby and Kate are a married couple. Unbeknownst to Kate, Abby prostitutes herself to numerous women.	United States	
2013	The Hot Flashes	Ginger Peabody	Daryl Hannah	Middle-aged, closeted Ginger comes out with the help of her friends on the basketball team.	United States	
2013	The Nun	Abbess Saint Eutrope	Isabelle Huppert	Eutrope is the superior mother of the church.	France, Belgium, Germany	
2013	Riddick	Dahl	Katee Sackhoff	A mercenary bounty hunter and the crew's sniper.	United States, Canada	
2014	Appropriate Behavior	Crystal	Halley Feiffer	Shirin is left homeless and jobless after her girlfriend Maxine breaks up with her.	United Kingdom	
2014	A Girl at My Door	Lee Young-nam	Bae Doona	Young-nam is a police officer. After a scandal involving her private life, she is transferred from Seoul to a station in a small coastal village. To protect a troubled girl who has been the victim of bullying and domestic abuse, she takes her into her home.	South Korea	
2014	Girltrash: All Night Long	Misty Monroe	Mandy Musgrave	The film is a prequel to the Girltrash! web series.	United States	
2014	Girltrash: All Night Long	Daisy Robson	Lisa Rieffel	The film is a prequel to the Girltrash! web series.	United States	
2014	Girltrash: All Night Long	Colby Robson	Gabrielle Christian	The film is a prequel to the Girltrash! web series.	United States	
2014	Girltrash: All Night Long	Sid	Kate French	The film is a prequel to the Girltrash! web series.	United States	
2014	The Humbling	Pegeen Mike Stapleford	Greta Gerwig	After a lifetime of lesbianism and female lovers, Pegee gives up women to be with Simon Axler, a once-legendary actor twice her age whom she has admired since childhood.	United States	
2014	Julia	Julia	Ashley C. Williams	Julia is a young woman who was drugged and raped by Pierce and three friends, then left for dead.	United States	
2014	Life Partners	Sasha Weiss	Leighton Meester	Sasha is a struggling musician with a string of bad dates.	United States	
2014	Lyle	Leah	Gaby Hoffmann	Leah and June are a young couple moving into a new home suffer a guilt and grief filled journey to losing their child.	United States	
2014	Lyle	June	Ingrid Jungermann	Leah and June are a young couple moving into a new home suffer a guilt and grief filled journey to losing their child.	United States	
2014	Never	Nikki	Zelda Williams	Nikki is a twenty-something musician who befriends a straight man and they develop a bond.	United States	
2014	Pride	Stephanie "Steph" Chambers	Faye Marsay	Stephanie is a founder of the Lesbians and Gays Support the Miners alliance. Stella is a militant member of LGSM. Zoe is Stella's girlfriend.	United Kingdom	
2014	Pride	Stella	Karina Fernandez	Stephanie is a founder of the Lesbians and Gays Support the Miners alliance. Stella is a militant member of LGSM. Zoe is Stella's girlfriend.	United Kingdom	
2014	Pride	Zoe	Jessie Cave	Stephanie is a founder of the Lesbians and Gays Support the Miners alliance. Stella is a militant member of LGSM. Zoe is Stella's girlfriend.	United Kingdom	
2014	The Taking of Deborah Logan	Sarah Logan	Anne Ramsay	Sarah becomes the caregiver for her ailing mother and tries to protect her from a demonic possession.	United States	
2014	Tammy	Lenore	Kathy Bates	Tammy and Pearl stay at the home of Pearl's cousin Lenore and her wife, Susanne.	United States	
2014	Tammy	Susanne	Sandra Oh	Tammy and Pearl stay at the home of Pearl's cousin Lenore and her wife, Susanne.	United States	
2014	This Is Where I Leave You	Hilary Altman	Jane Fonda	Altman announces to her family that she's turned into a happy, dedicated lesbian and is romantically involved with Linda.	United States	
2014	This Is Where I Leave You	Linda	Debra Monk	Altman announces to her family that she's turned into a happy, dedicated lesbian and is romantically involved with Linda.	United States	

=== 2015–2019 ===
List
Year	Title	Character(s)	Actor	Notes	Country	Ref(s)
2015	3 Generations	Dolly	Susan Sarandon	Dolly is Ray's grandmother, a quick-witted music manager who shares her brownstone with her life partner, Frances.	United States	
2015	3 Generations	Frances	Linda Emond	Dolly is Ray's grandmother, a quick-witted music manager who shares her brownstone with her life partner, Frances.	United States	
2015	Addicted to Fresno	Martha	Natasha Lyonne	Kelly is Martha's trainer who takes an interest on her.	United States	
2015	Addicted to Fresno	Kelly	Aubrey Plaza	Kelly is Martha's trainer who takes an interest on her.	United States	
2015	Carol	Carol Aird	Cate Blanchett	Carol was always attracted to females, but married as was expected of her social status and the post-World War II era. While in divorce proceedings, she meets Therese and comes out publicly after her love affair with her is exposed. Therese realizes she is gay after she meets Carol and falls in love with her. (The film is based on The Price of Salt by Patricia Highsmith.)	United Kingdom, United States	
2015	Carol	Therese Belivet	Rooney Mara	Carol was always attracted to females, but married as was expected of her social status and the post-World War II era. While in divorce proceedings, she meets Therese and comes out publicly after her love affair with her is exposed. Therese realizes she is gay after she meets Carol and falls in love with her. (The film is based on The Price of Salt by Patricia Highsmith.)	United Kingdom, United States	
2015	Dope	Cassandra "Diggy" Andrews	Kiersey Clemons	Diggy can be seen wearing masculine clothing.	United States	
2015	Freeheld	Laurel Hester	Julianne Moore	Real life story of police officer Laurel Hester who, after being diagnosed with terminal cancer, fought the Ocean County, New Jersey Board of Chosen Freeholders so that her pension benefits could be transferred to her domestic partner Stacie.	United States	
2015	Freeheld	Stacie Andree	Elliot Page (Note: First name changed after film release.)	Real life story of police officer Laurel Hester who, after being diagnosed with terminal cancer, fought the Ocean County, New Jersey Board of Chosen Freeholders so that her pension benefits could be transferred to her domestic partner Stacie.	United States	
2015	Grandma	Elle Reid	Lily Tomlin	Elle is a poet coping with the recent death of her long-term life partner. She ends a four-month relationship with a younger admirer, Olivia.	United States	
2015	Grandma	Olivia	Judy Greer	Elle is a poet coping with the recent death of her long-term life partner. She ends a four-month relationship with a younger admirer, Olivia.	United States	
2015	Skin Deep	Caitlin Davies	Monica Zanetti	Caitlin is a university student struggling with suicidal thoughts after the relationship with her girlfriend ends. She meets a young woman by chance who has terminal cancer, and they set out together on a whirlwind 'bucket list' adventure.	Australia	
2015	While You Weren't Looking	Dez	Sandi Schultz	Dez is a real estate developer. Terri takes care of their household. The mixed-race couple have been together for twenty years and live in suburban Cape Town with their adopted teenage daughter.	South Africa	
2015	While You Weren't Looking	Terri	Camilla Waldman	Dez is a real estate developer. Terri takes care of their household. The mixed-race couple have been together for twenty years and live in suburban Cape Town with their adopted teenage daughter.	South Africa	
2016	Allied	Bridget Vatan	Lizzy Caplan	Bridget is Max's sister.	United Kingdom, United States	
2016	Catfight	Lisa	Alicia Silverstone	Ashley is struggling to sell her artwork, straining the relationship with her girlfriend Lisa.	United States	
2016	Catfight	Ashley Miller	Anne Heche	Ashley is struggling to sell her artwork, straining the relationship with her girlfriend Lisa.	United States	
2016	Center of My World	Pascal	Nina Proll	Tereza is a lawyer who always has good advice for Phil.	Germany	
2016	Center of My World	Tereza	Inka Friedrich	Tereza is a lawyer who always has good advice for Phil.	Germany	
2016	Fight Valley	Tory Coro	Chelsea Durkalec	Tory is an MMA fighter in a relationship with Duke. Jamie is their mutual friend.	United States	
2016	Fight Valley	Duke	Erin O'Brien	Tory is an MMA fighter in a relationship with Duke. Jamie is their mutual friend.	United States	
2016	Fight Valley	Jamie	Cabrina Collesides	Tory is an MMA fighter in a relationship with Duke. Jamie is their mutual friend.	United States	
2016	First Girl I Loved	Anne Smith	Dylan Gelula	Anne is the nerdy editor of her high school yearbook. Sasha is a softball star in the school.	United States	
2016	First Girl I Loved	Sasha Basanez	Brianna Hildebrand	Anne is the nerdy editor of her high school yearbook. Sasha is a softball star in the school.	United States	
2016	The Handmaiden	Izumi Hideko / Lady	Kim Min-hee	Set in 1930's Korea, Sook-hee is a pickpocket hired as the maid of Lady Hideko, a young Japanese heiress, in a scheme designed to convince her into marrying a con man posing as a count and afterwards have her committed to an asylum. They fall in love and turn the tables on the conspirators. (Based on the 2002 historical crime novel Fingersmith by Sarah Waters.)	South Korea	
2016	The Handmaiden	Nam Sook-hee / Maid	Kim Tae-ri	Set in 1930's Korea, Sook-hee is a pickpocket hired as the maid of Lady Hideko, a young Japanese heiress, in a scheme designed to convince her into marrying a con man posing as a count and afterwards have her committed to an asylum. They fall in love and turn the tables on the conspirators. (Based on the 2002 historical crime novel Fingersmith by Sarah Waters.)	South Korea	
2016	I, Olga Hepnarová	Olga Hepnarová	Michalina Olszańska	Hepnarová was a Czechoslovak mass murderer, who killed eight people with a truck in 1973 Prague.	Czech Republic	
2016	The Intervention	Jessie	Clea DuVall	Jessie and Sarah are a couple.	United States	
2016	The Intervention	Sarah	Natasha Lyonne	Jessie and Sarah are a couple.	United States	
2016	Mother's Day	Gabi	Sarah Chalke	Gabi and Max are married, but Gabi has not come out to her parents because they're homophobic.	United States	
2016	Mother's Day	Max	Cameron Esposito	Gabi and Max are married, but Gabi has not come out to her parents because they're homophobic.	United States	
2016	The Neon Demon	Ruby	Jena Malone	Ruby is a makeup artist, who introduces Jesse to fellow older models Gigi and Sarah.	Denmark, France, United States	
2016	Spidarlings	Eden	Sophia Disgrace	Eden and Matila are a couple trying to get by.	United Kingdom	
2016	Spidarlings	Matilda	Rahel Kapsaski	Eden and Matila are a couple trying to get by.	United Kingdom	
2016	Their Finest	Phyl Moore	Rachael Stirling	Phyl is the Ministry of Information liaison keeping an eye on the screenwriters and coordinating the development of the film script. She wears button-down shirt and tie, jacket and tailored pants. She says to Catrin Cole, "I've never much seen the point in men"; and when one of the screenwriters asks who else the girls in the story are going to fall in love with she responds, "each other?"	United Kingdom	
2017	Allure	Laura Drake	Evan Rachel Wood	Laura Drake is an emotionally disturbed young woman who works as a house-cleaner for her father's company in an urban environment.	Canada	
2017	Anchor and Hope	Eva	Oona Chaplin	Eva and Kat's humble, yet carefree, life in their London canal boat is turned upside down when Eva gives Kat an ultimatum: she wants a child.	Spain, United Kingdom	
2017	Anchor and Hope	Kat	Natalia Tena	Eva and Kat's humble, yet carefree, life in their London canal boat is turned upside down when Eva gives Kat an ultimatum: she wants a child.	Spain, United Kingdom	
2017	Anna and the Apocalypse	Steph	Sarah Swire	Steph is a high school friend of Anna and fights the zombies together with her.	United Kingdom	
2017	Atomic Blonde	Delphine Lasalle	Sofia Boutella	Delphine is a young undercover French agent. She meets MI6 secret agent Lorraine in a bar, and they kiss passionately. Later they have sex, which evolves into a romantic relationship. The emotionally intimate post-sex scene between Delphine and Lorraine was deleted in the final cut but included in the DVD/Blu-ray bonus features under the title "Not Afraid of Love".	United States	
2017	Battle of the Sexes	Billie Jean King	Emma Stone	Biopic about champion tennis player King during the time of the famous tennis match between her and Bobby Riggs. She starts to explore her sexuality when she meets Bennett, a hairdresser. King falls in love with Bennett and has an affair with her.	United Kingdom, United States	
2017	Battle of the Sexes	Marilyn Bennett	Andrea Riseborough	Biopic about champion tennis player King during the time of the famous tennis match between her and Bobby Riggs. She starts to explore her sexuality when she meets Bennett, a hairdresser. King falls in love with Bennett and has an affair with her.	United Kingdom, United States	
2017	The Carmilla Movie	Carmilla Karnstein	Natasha Negovanlis	Carmilla and Laura are romantic partners. Based on the web series of the same name, the movie takes place five years after 330 year-old vampire Carmilla became human.	Canada	
2017	The Carmilla Movie	Laura Hollis	Elise Bauman	Carmilla and Laura are romantic partners. Based on the web series of the same name, the movie takes place five years after 330 year-old vampire Carmilla became human.	Canada	
2017	The Carmilla Movie	Elle Sheridan	Dominique Provost-Chalkley	Carmilla and Laura are romantic partners. Based on the web series of the same name, the movie takes place five years after 330 year-old vampire Carmilla became human.	Canada	
2017	The Carmilla Movie	Danny Lawrence	Sharon Belle	Carmilla and Laura are romantic partners. Based on the web series of the same name, the movie takes place five years after 330 year-old vampire Carmilla became human.	Canada	
2017	Disobedience	Esti Kuperman	Rachel McAdams	As a teenager, Esti had a forbidden romance with Ronit, the daughter of a rabbi. Because of Orthodox religious expectations and obligations, Esti married a man but always remained sexually attracted to females. Years later, following Roni's return to London, Esti comes to terms with her sexual orientation and separates from her husband.	United States, Ireland, United Kingdom	
2017	My Days of Mercy	Lucy Moro	Elliot Page (Note: First name changed after film release.)	Lucy feels betrayed after learning that Mercy has a boyfriend.	United States, United Kingdom	
2017	The Party	Martha	Cherry Jones	Martha and Jinny are a couple.	United Kingdom	
2017	The Party	Jinny	Emily Mortimer	Martha and Jinny are a couple.	United Kingdom	
2017	Power Rangers	Trini Kwan/Yellow Ranger	Becky G	The first LGBT superhero in a high-budget film.	United States	
2017	Princess Cyd	Katie	Malic White	Katie works as a barista.	United States	
2017	Return to Return to Nuke 'Em High AKA Volume 2	Lauren	Catherine Corcoran	Lauren and Chrissy are a secret couple.	United States	
2017	Return to Return to Nuke 'Em High AKA Volume 2	Chrissy	Asta Paredes	Lauren and Chrissy are a secret couple.	United States	
2017	Rough Night	Frankie	Ilana Glazer	Frankie is an activist and organizer of political protests.	United States	
2017	Signature Move	Zaynab	Fawzia Mirza	Zaynab is a Pakistani American lawyer who wants to be a lucha libre wrestler.	United States	
2017	Song to Song	Zoey	Bérénice Marlohe	Zoey is a wealthy French artist living in the US.	United States	
2017	Thelma	Thelma	Eili Harboe	Thelma discovers that she has an inexplicable power that materializes when she feels desire for Anja, a fellow student at her university.	Norway	
2017	Thelma	Anja	Kaya Wilkins	Thelma discovers that she has an inexplicable power that materializes when she feels desire for Anja, a fellow student at her university.	Norway	
2017	To the Bone	Judy	Lili Taylor	Judy is Ellen's mother.	United States	
2017	You, Me and Him	Olivia	Lucy Punch	Olivia and Alex are a couple. Olivia wants to become pregnant through artificial insemination, but Alex is not keen on parenthood. After Alex becomes very drunk at a party given by their womanizing neighbor, John, she is impregnated by him.	United Kingdom	
2017	You, Me and Him	Alex	Faye Marsay	Olivia and Alex are a couple. Olivia wants to become pregnant through artificial insemination, but Alex is not keen on parenthood. After Alex becomes very drunk at a party given by their womanizing neighbor, John, she is impregnated by him.	United Kingdom	
2018	Annihilation	Anya Thorensen	Gina Rodriguez	Anya is a paramedic in an all-female scientific expedition into a hazardous phenomenon zone called 'The Shimmer'.	United States, United Kingdom	
2018	Blockers	Sam Lockwood	Gideon Adlon	Sam has a crush on Angelica. She comes out to her father and friends. Then kisses Angelica at their senior prom.	United States	
2018	Blockers	Angelica	Ramona Young	Sam has a crush on Angelica. She comes out to her father and friends. Then kisses Angelica at their senior prom.	United States	
2018	Can You Ever Forgive Me?	Lee Israel	Melissa McCarthy	Israel attempts to revitalize her failing writing career by forging letters from deceased authors and playwrights.	United States	
2018	Diamantino	Lucia	Maria Leite	Lucia is a Secret Service agent disguised as a nun.	Portugal, France, Brazil	
2018	The Favourite	Anne, Queen of Great Britain	Olivia Colman	The plot examines the relationship between Queen Anne and cousins Abigail Masham and Sarah Churchill, who are both vying to be the court favourite.	United Kingdom, Ireland, United States	
2018	The Favourite	Abigail Masham	Emma Stone	The plot examines the relationship between Queen Anne and cousins Abigail Masham and Sarah Churchill, who are both vying to be the court favourite.	United Kingdom, Ireland, United States	
2018	Future World	Ash	Suki Waterhouse	Ash is a gynoid assassin under the command of the Warlord. After she becomes damaged and taken prisoner by the Drug Lord, she is repaired and reactivated by Lei, a mechanic also held prisoner. When Lei reveals her attraction towards her, Ash reciprocates. After a battle where Ash kills the Warlord, the two leave together for the wasteland to search for other gynoids.	United States	
2018	Future World	Lei	Margarita Levieva	Ash is a gynoid assassin under the command of the Warlord. After she becomes damaged and taken prisoner by the Drug Lord, she is repaired and reactivated by Lei, a mechanic also held prisoner. When Lei reveals her attraction towards her, Ash reciprocates. After a battle where Ash kills the Warlord, the two leave together for the wasteland to search for other gynoids.	United States	
2018	Hearts Beat Loud	Samantha Lee "Sam" Fisher	Kiersey Clemons	Sam secretly writes a song about her relationship with Rose.	United States	
2018	Hearts Beat Loud	Rose	Sasha Lane	Sam secretly writes a song about her relationship with Rose.	United States	
2018	The Heiresses	Chela	Ana Brun	Middle-aged Chela and Chiquita have been together for 30 years. Facing financial hardship due to Chiquita's debts, they are forced to start selling their possessions and find a way to procure money.	Paraguay, Uruguay, Germany, Brazil, Norway, France	
2018	The Heiresses	Chiquita	Margarita Irún	Middle-aged Chela and Chiquita have been together for 30 years. Facing financial hardship due to Chiquita's debts, they are forced to start selling their possessions and find a way to procure money.	Paraguay, Uruguay, Germany, Brazil, Norway, France	
2018	JT LeRoy	Eva	Diane Kruger	Eva is an actress and director. She has an affair with Savannah Knoop (bisexual).	Canada, United States, United Kingdom	
2018	Knife+Heart	Anne Parèze	Vanessa Paradis	In the summer of 1979 in Paris, Anne, a producer and director of gay pornography, is abandoned by her girlfriend and editor, Loïs.	France, Mexico, Switzerland	
2018	Knife+Heart	Lois McKenna	Kate Moran	In the summer of 1979 in Paris, Anne, a producer and director of gay pornography, is abandoned by her girlfriend and editor, Loïs.	France, Mexico, Switzerland	
2018	Lizzie	Lizzie Borden	Chloë Sevigny	Lizzie and Bridget, the live-in maid, become lovers. The film is a re-imagining of the Lizzie Borden story.	United States	
2018	Lizzie	Bridget "Maggie" Sullivan	Kristen Stewart	Lizzie and Bridget, the live-in maid, become lovers. The film is a re-imagining of the Lizzie Borden story.	United States	
2018	The Miseducation of Cameron Post	Cameron Post	Chloë Grace Moretz	Cameron is sent to a gay conversion therapy centre by her aunt for having sex with her girlfriend Coley.	United Kingdom, United States	
2018	The Miseducation of Cameron Post	Coley Taylor	Quinn Shephard	Cameron is sent to a gay conversion therapy centre by her aunt for having sex with her girlfriend Coley.	United Kingdom, United States	
2018	The Perfection	Charlotte Willmore	Allison Williams	Charlotte is a talented young cellist who befriends Elizabeth “Lizzie” Wells, Anton's star pupil and her replacement. After a night of clubbing, they return to Lizzie's hotel room and have sex.	United States	
2018	The Perfection	Elizabeth "Lizzie" Wells	Logan Browning	Charlotte is a talented young cellist who befriends Elizabeth “Lizzie” Wells, Anton's star pupil and her replacement. After a night of clubbing, they return to Lizzie's hotel room and have sex.	United States	
2018	The Professor	Olivia Brown	Odessa Young	Olivia is the daughter of professor Brown.	United States	
2018	Rafiki	Kena	Samantha Mugatsia	Kena and Ziki, develop a romance between them amidst family and political pressures around LGBT rights in Kenya.	Kenya	
2018	Rafiki	Ziki	Sheila Munyiva	Kena and Ziki, develop a romance between them amidst family and political pressures around LGBT rights in Kenya.	Kenya	
2018	Ready Player One	Helen "H" Harris	Lena Waithe	Harris's avatar Aech is Wade's best friend.	United States	
2018	Vice	Mary Cheney	Alison Pill	After Mary comes out, former vice president Dick Cheney decides to retire from public life to spare her from media scrutiny.	United States	
2018	Wild Nights with Emily	Emily Dickinson	Molly Shannon	Film story based on the lifelong romantic relationship between Emily and another woman, Susan, to whom she wrote poems and love letters that after Emily's death were falsely attributed as works she had directed to a man.	United States	
2019	Anna	Maude	Lera Abova	Maude is a fashion model in love with Anna, who unbeknownst to Maude is a double agent assassin.	France, United States	
2019	Before You Know It	Rachel Gurner	Hannah Pearl Utt	Rachel is a business-minded person whose attempts to be the responsible member of the family have made her something of a control freak.	United States	
2019	Bombshell	Jess Carr	Kate McKinnon	Jess is closeted and Hillary Clinton supporter.	United States, Canada	
2019	Booksmart	Amy Antsler	Kaitlyn Dever	Amy has a crush on a girl named Ryan, and later has her first lesbian sexual encounter with Hope, who has a reputation for not being nice.	United States	
2019	Booksmart	Hope	Diana Silvers	Amy has a crush on a girl named Ryan, and later has her first lesbian sexual encounter with Hope, who has a reputation for not being nice.	United States	
2019	Carmilla	Lara	Hannah Rae	When a carriage crash nearby brings a young woman into the family home to recuperate, Lara is enchanted by Carmilla. The pair then strike up a passionate romantic relationship.	United Kingdom	
2019	Carmilla	Carmilla	Devrim Lingnau	When a carriage crash nearby brings a young woman into the family home to recuperate, Lara is enchanted by Carmilla. The pair then strike up a passionate romantic relationship.	United Kingdom	
2019	Despite Everything	Sofía	Amaia Salamanca	Sofía and Marta are a couple, but Sofía has commitment issues.	Spain	
2019	Despite Everything	Marta	Ariana Martinez	Sofía and Marta are a couple, but Sofía has commitment issues.	Spain	
2019	Ek Ladki Ko Dekha Toh Aisa Laga	Sweety Chaudhary	Sonam Kapoor Ahuja	Sweety is a closeted homosexual who comes out to her traditional Punjabi father and family. Kuhu is Sweety's love interest. They are in a relationship that is kept secret.	India	
2019	Ek Ladki Ko Dekha Toh Aisa Laga	Kuhu	Regina Cassandra	Sweety is a closeted homosexual who comes out to her traditional Punjabi father and family. Kuhu is Sweety's love interest. They are in a relationship that is kept secret.	India	
2019	Elisa & Marcela	Elisa	Natalia de Molina	True story of two Spanish women who posed as a heterosexual couple in 1901 so that they could marry, with Marcela assuming the identity of "Mario Sánchez".	Spain	
2019	Elisa & Marcela	Marcela	Greta Fernández	True story of two Spanish women who posed as a heterosexual couple in 1901 so that they could marry, with Marcela assuming the identity of "Mario Sánchez".	Spain	
2019	Last Christmas	Marta Andrich	Lydia Leonard	Marta is outed to her parents by her sister Kate. She has been in a stable relationship with Alba.	United Kingdom, United States	
2019	Last Christmas	Alba	Jade Anouka	Marta is outed to her parents by her sister Kate. She has been in a stable relationship with Alba.	United Kingdom, United States	
2019	Let It Snow	Dorrie	Liv Hewson	Dorrie and Kerry begin a romantic relationship.	United States	
2019	Let It Snow	Kerry	Anna Akana	Dorrie and Kerry begin a romantic relationship.	United States	
2019	Moonlit Winter	Yoon-hee	Kim Hee-ae	Before Yoon-hee entered into an unhappy marriage with a friend of her brother, she was in love with Jun, resulting in her parents sending her to a mental hospital. Jun, however, never married and continued to feel the same about Yoon-hee. Twenty years later, a letter Jun wrote to Yoon-hee is mailed by Jun's aunt. When Yoon-hee's daughter accidentally reads the letter, she becomes determined to reunite her mother with the person from her past who made her happy.	South Korea	
2019	Moonlit Winter	Jun	Yûko Nakamura	Before Yoon-hee entered into an unhappy marriage with a friend of her brother, she was in love with Jun, resulting in her parents sending her to a mental hospital. Jun, however, never married and continued to feel the same about Yoon-hee. Twenty years later, a letter Jun wrote to Yoon-hee is mailed by Jun's aunt. When Yoon-hee's daughter accidentally reads the letter, she becomes determined to reunite her mother with the person from her past who made her happy.	South Korea	
2019	Portrait of a Lady on Fire	Héloïse	Noémie Merlant	Set in the 18th century, Héloïse is a painter commissioned to unobtrusively do the portrait of Marianne, who has been reluctant to pose for one because the painting was meant to be presented to her prospective husband, but Marianne did not want to marry. Héloïse and Marianne fall in love.	France	
2019	Portrait of a Lady on Fire	Marianne	Adèle Haenel	Set in the 18th century, Héloïse is a painter commissioned to unobtrusively do the portrait of Marianne, who has been reluctant to pose for one because the painting was meant to be presented to her prospective husband, but Marianne did not want to marry. Héloïse and Marianne fall in love.	France	
2019	Riot Girls	Nat	Madison Iseman	Nat and Scratch are a couple.	Canada	
2019	Riot Girls	Scratch	Paloma Kwiatkowski	Nat and Scratch are a couple.	Canada	
2019	Saint Maud	Amanda Köhl	Jennifer Ehle	A hedonist and atheist, Amanda was a celebrated dancer and choreographer before she was felled by a terminal illness and became disabled. Carol is Amanda's lover.	United Kingdom	
2019	Saint Maud	Carol	Lily Frazer	A hedonist and atheist, Amanda was a celebrated dancer and choreographer before she was felled by a terminal illness and became disabled. Carol is Amanda's lover.	United Kingdom	
2019	Sebastina: The Curse	Paula	Andrea Luna	Paula is a university student spending the weekend with friends at the site of a tragic 17th century death. She is in love with her best friend Mafe.	Peru	
2019	Someone Great	Erin Kennedy	DeWanda Wise	Erin is best friends with Jenny and Blair. Although Erin loves her girlfriend, Leah, she is commitment-phobic.	United States	
2019	Sword of Trust	Cynthia	Jillian Bell	Cynthia and Mary are a couple.	United States	
2019	Sword of Trust	Mary	Michaela Watkins	Cynthia and Mary are a couple.	United States	
2019	To the Stars	Maggie Richmond	Liana Liberato	Maggie and closeted Hazel are drawn to each other and have sex.	United States	
2019	To the Stars	Hazel Atkins	Adelaide Clemens	Maggie and closeted Hazel are drawn to each other and have sex.	United States	
2019	Two of Us	Nina Dorn	Barbara Sukowa	While living in the same apartment building, Nina and Madeleine have been secret lovers for many years. All the while, Madeleine remained in a loveless marriage. After the death of her husband the two women decide to come out to Madeleine's adult children so that they can finally live together, but Madeleine loses her nerve, which leads to an angry argument with Nina, followed by a stroke. Madeleine's children cannot understand why Nina is always hanging around Madeleine while she is convalescing because they considered her to be just a neighbor. (The film was the Best International Feature Film submission by France at the 93rd Academy Awards.)	France, Belgium, Luxembourg	
2019	Two of Us	Madeleine Girard	Martine Chevallier		France, Belgium, Luxembourg	

=== 2020–2024 ===
List
Year	Title	Character(s)	Actor	Notes	Country	Ref(s)
2020	Ammonite	Mary Anning	Kate Winslet	Mary is a fossil collector and paleontologist. She is hired by a geologist to care for his wife, Charlotte, and keep her company while he's away on an expedition. Mary falls in love with her.	United Kingdom, Australia	
2020	Bruised	Bobbi 'Buddhakan' Berroa	Sheila Atim	Bobbi is a trainer. She begins an intimate relationship with Jackie, an MMA fighter.	United States, United Kingdom	
2020	Dating Amber	Amber Keenan	Lola Petticrew	To dodge bullying by homophobic classmates, Amber convinces her closeted new friend Eddie to fake-date and pretend they are a couple.	Ireland, United Kingdom, United States, Belgium	
2020	Ellie & Abbie (& Ellie's Dead Aunt)	Ellie	Sophie Hawkshaw	Ellie is a high schooler that just came out to her mother and wants to invite her girl crush to the year 12 formal. She is aided by her lesbian aunt Pattie and guided by the ghost of her lesbian aunt Tara.	Australia	
2020	Ellie & Abbie (& Ellie's Dead Aunt)	Patty	Rachel House	Ellie is a high schooler that just came out to her mother and wants to invite her girl crush to the year 12 formal. She is aided by her lesbian aunt Pattie and guided by the ghost of her lesbian aunt Tara.	Australia	
2020	Ellie & Abbie (& Ellie's Dead Aunt)	Tara	Julia Billington	Ellie is a high schooler that just came out to her mother and wants to invite her girl crush to the year 12 formal. She is aided by her lesbian aunt Pattie and guided by the ghost of her lesbian aunt Tara.	Australia	
2020	Forgotten Roads	Claudina	Rosa Ramírez	Septuagenarian Claudina has lived a traditional and repressed life. After the death of her husband, her life and world begins to change with self-discovery. She comes out to herself when she meets her neighbor Elsa (bisexual) and falls in love with her.	Chile	
2020	Friend of the World	Diane	Alexandra Slade	Diane is an experimental filmmaker whose sexual orientation isn't the only difference between her and Gore, an insane war general. Eva is Diane's lover.	United States	
2020	Friend of the World	Eva	Kathryn Schott	Diane is an experimental filmmaker whose sexual orientation isn't the only difference between her and Gore, an insane war general. Eva is Diane's lover.	United States	
2020	Friendsgiving	Abby	Kat Dennings	Abby came out at 29 years old and was dumped by her first girlfriend. The quiet Thanksgiving she planned with her best friend Molly turns into a large party after several friends and acquaintances, including lesbian friends who want to find a new girlfriend for Abby, start to show up for the holiday dinner.	United States	
2020	The Half of It	Ellie Chu	Leah Lewis	A shy, introverted, straight-A student who earns money on the side by writing papers for fellow students, accepts being the ghostwriter of heartfelt correspondence from a football player pupil to the girl he wants to date. In the process, Ellie falls in love with her. The film is a spin on the play Cyrano de Bergerac.	United States	
2020	Happiest Season	Abby	Kristen Stewart	Abby and Harper are in a romantic relationship. Riley is Harper's ex-girlfriend.	United States	
2020	Happiest Season	Harper	Mackenzie Davis	Abby and Harper are in a romantic relationship. Riley is Harper's ex-girlfriend.	United States	
2020	Happiest Season	Riley Johnson	Aubrey Plaza	Abby and Harper are in a romantic relationship. Riley is Harper's ex-girlfriend.	United States	
2020	Holly Slept Over	Holly	Nathalie Emmanuel	Holly had a fling in college with Audra as a lesbian experiment.	United States	
2020	I Care a Lot	Marla Grayson	Rosamund Pike	Marla and Fran are romantic and business partners.	United States	
2020	I Care a Lot	Fran	Eiza González	Marla and Fran are romantic and business partners.	United States	
2020	Kajillionaire	Old Dolio Dyne	Evan Rachel Wood	Dyne is an emotionally stunted 26-year-old woman in a manipulative relationship with her con artist parents. She later begins a relationship with Melanie, a friendly young woman.	United States	
2020	Kajillionaire	Melanie Whitacre	Gina Rodriguez	Dyne is an emotionally stunted 26-year-old woman in a manipulative relationship with her con artist parents. She later begins a relationship with Melanie, a friendly young woman.	United States	
2020	Kiss Me Kosher	Maria	Luise Wolfram	Shira's relationship with Maria, who is German, leads to conflict with her Holocaust survivor grandmother.	Germany, Israel	
2020	Kiss Me Kosher	Shira	Moran Rosenblatt	Shira's relationship with Maria, who is German, leads to conflict with her Holocaust survivor grandmother.	Germany, Israel	
2020	My First Summer	Grace	Maiah Stewardson	Grace is a rebellious but free-spirited idealist, who is determined to help Claudia through her tragedy and introduce her to things from the outside world.	Australia	
2020	The Prom	Emma Nolan	Jo Ellen Pellman	Emma, a 17-year-old girl, wants to bring her girlfriend Alyssa to the high school prom. Alyssa is a cheerleader and closeted.	United States	
2020	The Prom	Alyssa Greene	Ariana DeBose	Emma, a 17-year-old girl, wants to bring her girlfriend Alyssa to the high school prom. Alyssa is a cheerleader and closeted.	United States	
2020	Summer of Mesa	Mesa	Andrea Granera	Mesa is a confident and beautiful teenage girl.	United States	
2020	Summerland	Alice Lamb	Gemma Arterton	Alice is a reclusive historian of folklore. When she reluctantly takes in an Operation Pied Piper evacuee from the London Blitz, she confronts her past and the love she lost.	United Kingdom	
2020	Unpregnant	Bailey Butler	Barbie Ferreira	Bailey has her first kiss with Kira after revealing her sexuality.	United States	
2020	Unpregnant	Kira Matthews	Betty Who	Bailey has her first kiss with Kira after revealing her sexuality.	United States	
2020	Valley Girl	Jack	Mae Whitman	Jack is Randy's best friend, bandmate, and wingman.	United States	
2020	The World to Come	Abigail	Katherine Waterston	Set in the 19th century, Abigail is in a marriage of convenience to a farmer. She meets Tallie, who moves into a farm nearby and is married to an abusive husband. A deep friendship develops between them, becoming a secret romantic relationship.	United States	
2020	The World to Come	Tallie	Vanessa Kirby	Set in the 19th century, Abigail is in a marriage of convenience to a farmer. She meets Tallie, who moves into a farm nearby and is married to an abusive husband. A deep friendship develops between them, becoming a secret romantic relationship.	United States	
2021	After Blue	Zora	Elina Löwensohn	Zora is the hairdresser of planet After Blue. She falls for avant-garde artist Sternberg.	France	
2021	Benedetta	Benedetta Carlini	Virginie Efira	Benedetta, a novitiate in a 17th-century Italian convent, begins a love affair with another nun.	France	
2021	Christmas at the Ranch	Haley Hollis	Laur Allen	Power broker Holly returns to her family ranch, Hollis Hills, to help her grandmother save it from bankruptcy and prevent being forced to sell it. Kate is the experienced ranch hand who cares about what happens to the ranch.	United States	
2021	Christmas at the Ranch	Kate	Amanda Righetti	Power broker Holly returns to her family ranch, Hollis Hills, to help her grandmother save it from bankruptcy and prevent being forced to sell it. Kate is the experienced ranch hand who cares about what happens to the ranch.	United States	
2021	The Fallout	Mia Reed	Maddie Ziegler	Mia is an Instagram influencer. During a night of drinking, she has sex with Vada, who has a boyfriend.	United States	
2021	Fear Street Part One: 1994	Deena Johnson	Kiana Madeira	Denna and Samantha are a young couple. (This film is the first installment in the Fear Street trilogy.)	United States	
2021	Fear Street Part One: 1994	Samantha "Sam" Fraser	Olivia Scott Welch	Denna and Samantha are a young couple. (This film is the first installment in the Fear Street trilogy.)	United States	
2021	Fear Street Part Three: 1666	Deena Johnson	Kiana Madeira	When the witch's grave is discovered and Deena comes in contact with her severed skeletal hand, she is transported back in time and into Sarah Fier's body. Sarah was falsely accused of being a witch and hung. She is blamed for cursing Shadyside and causing centuries of unexplained violence and murders in the town. In truth, she was the victim of homophobia, sexism, and superstition. Hannah is Sarah's lover. (This film is the third installment in the Fear Street trilogy.)	United States	
2021	Fear Street Part Three: 1666	Sarah Fier	Elizabeth Scopel	When the witch's grave is discovered and Deena comes in contact with her severed skeletal hand, she is transported back in time and into Sarah Fier's body. Sarah was falsely accused of being a witch and hung. She is blamed for cursing Shadyside and causing centuries of unexplained violence and murders in the town. In truth, she was the victim of homophobia, sexism, and superstition. Hannah is Sarah's lover. (This film is the third installment in the Fear Street trilogy.)	United States	
2021	Fear Street Part Three: 1666	Sarah Fier	Kiana Madeira	When the witch's grave is discovered and Deena comes in contact with her severed skeletal hand, she is transported back in time and into Sarah Fier's body. Sarah was falsely accused of being a witch and hung. She is blamed for cursing Shadyside and causing centuries of unexplained violence and murders in the town. In truth, she was the victim of homophobia, sexism, and superstition. Hannah is Sarah's lover. (This film is the third installment in the Fear Street trilogy.)	United States	
2021	Fear Street Part Three: 1666	Hannah Miller	Olivia Scott Welch	When the witch's grave is discovered and Deena comes in contact with her severed skeletal hand, she is transported back in time and into Sarah Fier's body. Sarah was falsely accused of being a witch and hung. She is blamed for cursing Shadyside and causing centuries of unexplained violence and murders in the town. In truth, she was the victim of homophobia, sexism, and superstition. Hannah is Sarah's lover. (This film is the third installment in the Fear Street trilogy.)	United States	
2021	Fear Street Part Three: 1666	Samantha "Sam" Fraser	Olivia Scott Welch	When the witch's grave is discovered and Deena comes in contact with her severed skeletal hand, she is transported back in time and into Sarah Fier's body. Sarah was falsely accused of being a witch and hung. She is blamed for cursing Shadyside and causing centuries of unexplained violence and murders in the town. In truth, she was the victim of homophobia, sexism, and superstition. Hannah is Sarah's lover. (This film is the third installment in the Fear Street trilogy.)	United States	
2021	Matcha & Vanilla	Yuki	Tomoko Hayakawa	Yuki and Ai are a couple. When Yuki is diagnosed with lung cancer, they must fight their families and Japan's conservative society to stay together until Yuki's inevitable death.	Japan	
2021	Matcha & Vanilla	Ai	Qyoko Kudo	Yuki and Ai are a couple. When Yuki is diagnosed with lung cancer, they must fight their families and Japan's conservative society to stay together until Yuki's inevitable death.	Japan	
2021	The Novice	Alex Dall	Isabelle Fuhrman	Alex is a perfectionist who joins her college rowing team. She starts a romance with Dani, her teacher's assistant.	United States	
2021	The Novice	Dani	Dilone	Alex is a perfectionist who joins her college rowing team. She starts a romance with Dani, her teacher's assistant.	United States	
2021	Nudo Mixteco	María	Sonia Couoh	María uses her home visit to reunite with her old lover, Piedad, who now has a baby	Mexico	
2021	One Four Three	Rebecca	Ellouise Shakespeare-Hart	Rebecca is the woman that Genevieve left her fiancé for.	United Kingdom	
2021	The Retreat	Renee	Tommie-Amber Pirie	Renee and Valerie are a same-sex couple who book a weekend trip to a cabin in the woods, only to be abducted and tortured by a mysterious figure	Canada	
2021	The Retreat	Valerie	Sarah Allen	Renee and Valerie are a same-sex couple who book a weekend trip to a cabin in the woods, only to be abducted and tortured by a mysterious figure	Canada	
2021	Ride or Die	Rei Nagasawa	Kiko Mizuhara	Rei was in love with Nanae when they were in high school. She decides to kill Nanae's abusive husband to prove her love for her.	Japan	
2021	Sentinelle	Klara	Olga Kurylenko	The first hint that Klara is lesbian is her observing the nude body of a female soldier in their locker room. Later, she dances with a woman in a nightclub and has a one-night stand with her.	France	
2021	Silent Night	Alex	Kirby Howell-Baptiste	Alex and Bella are married.	United Kingdom, United States	
2021	Silent Night	Bella	Lucy Punch	Alex and Bella are married.	United Kingdom, United States	
2021	Stillwater	Allison Baker	Abigail Breslin	Allion is convicted of murdering her roommate and unfaithful lover, Lina.	United States	
2021	Twist	Sikes	Lena Headey	Sikes is a burglar and criminal. She is attracted to Nancy "Red" Lee. (The film is an adaptation of Charles Dickens's 1838 novel Oliver Twist.)	United Kingdom	
2021	Walk with Me	Logan Pierce	Bridget Barkan	As Amber struggles to find her way, she meets Logan, a free spirited musician with a kind heart who lends an ear to Amber's situation.	United States	
2021	Wheel of Fortune and Fantasy	Moka Natsuko	Fusako Urabe	Moka is a middle-aged woman with memory loss who goes in search of the girlfriend she had in high-school.	Japan	
2022	Aftersun	Sophie	Celia Rowlson-Hall	The partner of adult Sophie is a woman and she is the parent of an infant with her.	United Kingdom, United States	
2022	The Almond and the Seahorse	Toni	Charlotte Gainsbourg	Toni and Gwen have been together for 15 years. Gwen sustained a traumatic brain injury in a car accident.	United Kingdom	
2022	The Almond and the Seahorse	Gwen	Trine Dyrholm	Toni and Gwen have been together for 15 years. Gwen sustained a traumatic brain injury in a car accident.	United Kingdom	
2022	Am I Ok?	Lucy	Dakota Johnson	A woman living in Los Angeles, who realizes that all her dates with men are unsuccessful because of her sexuality. With the help of her lifelong best friend Jane, Lucy attempts to navigate coming out and dating women in her 30s.	United States	
2022	Attachment	Maja	Josephine Park	Maja is a fading actress and Leah is a university student. Leah shares her home with her mother. After Leah has a seizure, Maja moves in with her. Maja learns that Leah may be possessed by a dybbuk.	Denmark	
2022	Attachment	Leah	Ellie Kendrick	Maja is a fading actress and Leah is a university student. Leah shares her home with her mother. After Leah has a seizure, Maja moves in with her. Maja learns that Leah may be possessed by a dybbuk.	Denmark	
2022	Babylon	Lady Fay Zhu	Li Jun Li	Cabaret entertainer Zhu has an affair with Nellie.	United States	
2022	Badhaai Do	Suman Singh	Bhumi Pednekar	Suman enters into a lavender marriage to escape the pressure from her family. Rimjhim is Suman's girlfriend.	India	
2022	Badhaai Do	Rimjhim Jongkey	Chum Darang	Suman enters into a lavender marriage to escape the pressure from her family. Rimjhim is Suman's girlfriend.	India	
2022	Bodies Bodies Bodies	Bee	Maria Bakalova	Bee is a working-class young woman from Eastern Europe traveling with her wealthy girlfriend Sophie.	United States	
2022	Bodies Bodies Bodies	Sophie	Amandla Stenberg	Bee is a working-class young woman from Eastern Europe traveling with her wealthy girlfriend Sophie.	United States	
2022	Blue Jean	Jean	Rosy McEwen	Jean is a closeted physical education teacher living a double life. When a new student at her school sees her in a lesbian bar, she must decide whether to save her career and personal safety, or risk it. Viv is Jean's out and proud long-term girlfriend. The film is set during the introduction of Section 28 anti-homosexuality laws in Britain.	United Kingdom	
2022	Blue Jean	Viv	Kerrie Hayes	Jean is a closeted physical education teacher living a double life. When a new student at her school sees her in a lesbian bar, she must decide whether to save her career and personal safety, or risk it. Viv is Jean's out and proud long-term girlfriend. The film is set during the introduction of Section 28 anti-homosexuality laws in Britain.	United Kingdom	
2022	Call Jane	Virginia	Sigourney Weaver	Virginia is a women's health and abortion activist, and leader of the "Jane" underground group.	United States	
2022	Causeway	Lynsey	Jennifer Lawrence	Lynsey is a veteran of the Afghanistan War recovering from combat injuries.	United States	
2022	Dangerous	Nalini	Naina Ganguly	Nalini and Rashmi love each other. (Billed as India's first lesbian crime drama.)	India	
2022	Dangerous	Rashmi	Apsara Rani	Nalini and Rashmi love each other. (Billed as India's first lesbian crime drama.)	India	
2022	Death on the Nile	Mrs. Bowers	Dawn French	Mrs. Bowers and Marie are a secret couple. When in public, Bowers presents herself as Marie's nurse.	United Kingdom, United States	
2022	Death on the Nile	Marie Van Schuyler	Jennifer Saunders	Mrs. Bowers and Marie are a secret couple. When in public, Bowers presents herself as Marie's nurse.	United Kingdom, United States	
2022	Do Revenge	Eleanor	Maya Hawke	Transfer student Eleanor, who was outed at summer camp when she was 13 years old and became the subject of a false rumor, finds that she's now attending the same school as her nemesis from camp. Eleanor crushes on Gabbi, a confident student who has no interest in being involved in school cliques.	United States	
2022	Do Revenge	Gabbi	Talia Ryder	Transfer student Eleanor, who was outed at summer camp when she was 13 years old and became the subject of a false rumor, finds that she's now attending the same school as her nemesis from camp. Eleanor crushes on Gabbi, a confident student who has no interest in being involved in school cliques.	United States	
2022	Everything Everywhere All at Once	Joy Wang / Jobu Tupaki	Stephanie Hsu	Joy has been trying to get her mother to accept her girlfriend, Becky.	United States	
2022	Everything Everywhere All at Once	Becky	Tallie Medel	Joy has been trying to get her mother to accept her girlfriend, Becky.	United States	
2022	Girl Picture	Mimmi	Aamu Milonoff	Three young girls at the cusp of womanhood, try to defy the persistent winter darkness in Finland by trying to draw their own contours.	Finland	
2022	Girl Picture	Emma	Linnea Leino	Three young girls at the cusp of womanhood, try to defy the persistent winter darkness in Finland by trying to draw their own contours.	Finland	
2022	Maja Ma	Pallavi Patel	Madhuri Dixit	Pallavi is a closeted homosexual who married and had children. She fell in love with Kanchan when they were young women, but did not accept her request to run away together. She impulsively comes out to her daughter during an argument.	India	
2022	Maja Ma	Kanchan Adhia	Simone Singh	Pallavi is a closeted homosexual who married and had children. She fell in love with Kanchan when they were young women, but did not accept her request to run away together. She impulsively comes out to her daughter during an argument.	India	
2022	Marry Me	Parker Debbs	Sarah Silverman	Parker is a huge fan of pop star Kat Valdez and a friend of Charlie. She takes him and his daughter to a concert by Valdez, carrying a sign that says "Marry Me!". Parker asks Charlie to hold the sign while she shoots a video of Valdez performing a song. Valdez sees the sign and picks Charlie to marry her. Parker encourages Charlie to go along with it.	United States	
2022	Mars One	Eunice	Camilla Damião	Eunice is a young woman who wants to be more independent and move out of her parents house. She begins a romantic relationship with another woman but fears telling her parents, particularly her traditional father.	Brazil	
2022	Moving On	Evelyn	Lily Tomlin	Evvie comes to terms with her unfulfilled life as a cellist.	United States	
2022	My Best Friend's Exorcism	Glee Tanaka	Cathy Ang	Shy, closeted Glee is tricked into coming out by demon possessed Gretchen.	United States	
2022	My Policeman	Jackie Stewart	Maddie Rice	Friend of Marion Taylor, who sees what's happening between her policeman husband and his male friend.	United States	
2022	Nope	Emerald "Em" Haywood	Keke Palmer	Emerald brags about flirting with women and having sex with them.	United States	
2022	The Origin of Evil	Nathalie Cordier	Laure Calamy	Natalie is an ex-convict whose financial situation begins to deteriorate after her girlfriend, Stéphane, is sent to prison. Stéphane was born out of wedlock and has a wealthy father she has never met. Nathalie assumes Stéphane's identity and contacts him.	France, Canada	
2022	The Origin of Evil	Stéphane Marson	Suzanne Clément	Natalie is an ex-convict whose financial situation begins to deteriorate after her girlfriend, Stéphane, is sent to prison. Stéphane was born out of wedlock and has a wealthy father she has never met. Nathalie assumes Stéphane's identity and contacts him.	France, Canada	
2022	Senior Year	Martha Reiser	Mary Holland	One of Stephanie's closest friends in high school, but closeted when she was young. Becomes Harding High's principal and cheerleader coach.	United States	
2022	Sneakerella	Sami	Devyn Nekoda	Skateboarder Sami is El's best friend.	United States	
2022	Tack för senast	Ullis	Liv Mjönes	Ullis and Tessan are a couple. Ullis likes relationships that aren't demanding, but Tessan wants to be a parent.	Sweden	
2022	Tack för senast	Tessan	Madeleine Martin	Ullis and Tessan are a couple. Ullis likes relationships that aren't demanding, but Tessan wants to be a parent.	Sweden	
2022	Tár	Lydia Tár	Cate Blanchett	Lydia is the first female chief conductor of a major German orchestra. She refers to herself as a "U-Haul lesbian". Sharon is her concertmaster and wife. They have an adopted daughter.	United States, Germany	
2022	Tár	Sharon Goodnow	Nina Hoss	Lydia is the first female chief conductor of a major German orchestra. She refers to herself as a "U-Haul lesbian". Sharon is her concertmaster and wife. They have an adopted daughter.	United States, Germany	
2022	They/Them	Kim	Anna Lore	Kim is a closeted lesbian sent to the Whistler Camp, a conversion camp.	United States	
2022	Whitney Houston: I Wanna Dance with Somebody	Robyn Crawford	Nafessa Williams	This version of Crawford enters a romantic relationship with Whitney Houston.	United States	
2022	You Can Live Forever	Jaime	Anwen O'Driscoll	A romantic relationship develops between two young women in a Jehovah's Witness religious community.	Canada	
2022	You Can Live Forever	Marike	June Laporte	A romantic relationship develops between two young women in a Jehovah's Witness religious community.	Canada	
2023	All the Silence	Miriam	Adriana Llabrés	Miriam, a part time sign language teacher and actress, is diagnosed with impending hearing loss. Her girlfriend, Lola, and her parents are deaf, but Miriam refuses to accept a life without sound.	Mexico	
2023	All the Silence	Lola	Ludwika Paleta	Miriam, a part time sign language teacher and actress, is diagnosed with impending hearing loss. Her girlfriend, Lola, and her parents are deaf, but Miriam refuses to accept a life without sound.	Mexico	
2023	Anyone but You	Claudia	Alexandra Shipp	Claudia and Halle are engaged and planning their wedding in Sydney, Australia	United States	
2023	Anyone but You	Halle	Hadley Robinson	Claudia and Halle are engaged and planning their wedding in Sydney, Australia	United States	
2023	Backspot	Eileen McNamara	Evan Rachel Wood	Eileen is the ruthless coach of the cheerleading team.	Canada, United States	
2023	Bad Things	Ruthie Nodd	Gayle Rankin	Ruthie inherited her grandmother's abandoned hotel, and has returned to stay in it for a few days with her girlfriend Cal and others.	United States	
2023	Bad Things	Cal	Hari Nef	Ruthie inherited her grandmother's abandoned hotel, and has returned to stay in it for a few days with her girlfriend Cal and others.	United States	
2023	Bottoms	PJ	Rachel Sennott	High school students PJ and Josie start an all-female fight club so that they can meet cheerleaders and get laid.	United States	
2023	Bottoms	Josie	Ayo Edebiri	High school students PJ and Josie start an all-female fight club so that they can meet cheerleaders and get laid.	United States	
2023	Chuck Chuck Baby	Joanne	Annabel Scholey	Self-confident Joanne is the childhood crush of Helen who suffers from a childhood trauma.	United Kingdom	
2023	The Color Purple	Celie Harris-Johnson	Fantasia Barrino	Celie enters into a relationship with jazz singer Shug Avery.	United States	
2023	The Color Purple	Celie Harris-Johnson	Phylicia Pearl Mpasi	Celie enters into a relationship with jazz singer Shug Avery.	United States	
2023	Days of Happiness	Emma	Sophie Desmarais	Emma is an orchestra conductor who is navigating her toxic relationship with her father and agent Patrick and her budding new romantic relationship with Naëlle.	Canada	
2023	Days of Happiness	Naëlle	Nour Belkhiria	Emma is an orchestra conductor who is navigating her toxic relationship with her father and agent Patrick and her budding new romantic relationship with Naëlle.	Canada	
2023	A Deadly Invitation	Agatha	Regina Blandón	Agatha is the host of a podcast about unsolved crimes.	Mexico	
2023	Dumb Money	Riri	Myha'la Herrold	College students Riri and Harmony are a couple. They invest all their money in GameStop stocks.	United States	
2023	Dumb Money	Harmony Williams	Talia Ryder	College students Riri and Harmony are a couple. They invest all their money in GameStop stocks.	United States	
2023	Eileen	Eileen Dunlop	Thomasin McKenzie	Rebecca is a psychologist at a juvenile correctional facility, who develops a relationship with Eileen.	United States	
2023	Eileen	Rebecca Saint John	Anne Hathaway	Rebecca is a psychologist at a juvenile correctional facility, who develops a relationship with Eileen.	United States	
2023	Fancy Dance	Jax	Lily Gladstone	Native American ex-convict Jax is Roki's aunt. She teaches Roki how to steal and takes her away from her grandparents, who had custody of Roki after her mother disappeared.	United States	
2023	Freud's Last Session	Anna Freud	Liv Lisa Fries	Anna is Sigmund Freud's daughter. She and Dorothy are in a relationship.	United States, United Kingdom	
2023	Freud's Last Session	Dorothy Burlingham	Jodi Balfour	Anna is Sigmund Freud's daughter. She and Dorothy are in a relationship.	United States, United Kingdom	
2023	Herd	Jamie Miller	Ellen Adair	Couple Jamie and Alex go on a canoe trip getaway to try to repair their marriage. After Alex breaks her leg in an accident and they go for help, they encounter sinister people and a zombie outbreak.	United States	
2023	Herd	Alex Kanai	Mitzi Akaha	Couple Jamie and Alex go on a canoe trip getaway to try to repair their marriage. After Alex breaks her leg in an accident and they go for help, they encounter sinister people and a zombie outbreak.	United States	
2023	Hunt Club	Cassandra	Mena Suvari	Cassandra accepts an offer to participate in a $100,000 cash prize hunt on a private island. After she arrives, she discovers that women are the game that is going to be hunted.	United States	
2023	It's a Wonderful Knife	Gale Prescott	Katharine Isabelle	Gale is Winnie's sympathetic aunt.	United States	
2023	Jagged Mind	Billie	Maisie Richardson-Sellers	Billie and Alex are dating.	United States	
2023	Jagged Mind	Alex	Shannon Woodward	Billie and Alex are dating.	United States	
2023	Khufiya	Krishna Mehra (aka KM)	Tabu	KM is a closeted intelligence officer in the Research and Analysis Wing agency.	India	
2023	Kill Boksoon	Gil Jae-yeong	Kim Si-a	Jae-young is Gil Bok-Soon's teenage daughter.	South Korea	
2023	My Animal	Heather	Bobbi Salvör Menuez	Heather is a tomboy and werewolf. She falls in love with Jonny, a figure skater.	Canada	
2023	My Mother's Wedding (Note: Formerly titled North Star.)	Katherine	Scarlett Johansson	Katherine is the first female captain in the Royal Navy. Working at sea for months has led to tension with her long-term partner Jack. They are co-raising Marcus, but do not plan to marry.	United Kingdom	
2023	My Mother's Wedding	Jack	Freida Pinto	Katherine is the first female captain in the Royal Navy. Working at sea for months has led to tension with her long-term partner Jack. They are co-raising Marcus, but do not plan to marry.	United Kingdom	
2023	Nyad	Diana Nyad	Annette Bening	Biopic about long-distance swimmer Nyad's swim from Cuba to Florida in 2013. Stoll is Nyad's swimming coach.	United States	
2023	Nyad	Bonnie Stoll	Jodie Foster	Biopic about long-distance swimmer Nyad's swim from Cuba to Florida in 2013. Stoll is Nyad's swimming coach.	United States	
2023	The Persian Version	Lelia	Layla Mohammadi	Lelia is a filmmaker whose relationship with her mother deteriorated after she brought her wife to her parents' home on Thanksgiving.	United States	
2023	Say I Do to Me	Yi "Yee" Lok	Candy Lo	Closeted Yee follows YouTuber influencer Ping Cheung on social media, and offers to sponsor her. Her admiration of Ping encourages her to come out.	Hong Kong	
2023	Shortcomings	Alice	Sherry Cola	Alice is a 'philanderer' and Ben's best friend.	United States	
2023	A Song Sung Blue	Liu Xian	Zhou Meijun	Xian, a shy and introverted 15-year-old, becomes romantically infatuated with Mingmei, the daughter of her father's girlfriend.	China	
2023	Tripped Up	Taylor	Sasha Fox	Taylor, a musician and friend of Lizzie, joins her on the road trip female-bonding getaway to the Saucy Food Festival. There she meets a new girlfriend.	United States	
2023	You People	Liza	Molly Gordon	Ezra's parents Shelley and Arnold awkwardly explain that they are accepting and supportive of everyone, including their daughter Liza.	United States	
2024	All Shall Be Well	Angie	Patra Au	Angie and Pat have been a couple for over forty years. After Pat suddenly dies, her family takes over the arrangements for burial proceedings, referring to Angie as just a best friend of Pat. Because she did not finalize a will, the apartment that Pat bought for herself and Angie, and lived in, is passed to Pat's next of kin, leaving Angie without any rights to the property.	Hong Kong	
2024	All Shall Be Well	Pat	Maggie Li Lin Lin	Angie and Pat have been a couple for over forty years. After Pat suddenly dies, her family takes over the arrangements for burial proceedings, referring to Angie as just a best friend of Pat. Because she did not finalize a will, the apartment that Pat bought for herself and Angie, and lived in, is passed to Pat's next of kin, leaving Angie without any rights to the property.	Hong Kong	
2024	Compulsion	Evie	Anna-Maria Sieklucka	Evie takes a vacation at her stepfather’s villa in Malta and becomes the target of con artists.	United Kingdom	
2024	Daughter's Daughter	Fan Zuer	Eugenie Liu	Zuer is Ai's rebellious daughter who travels to New York to embark on IVF treatment with her girlfriend Jiayi.	Taiwan	
2024	Daughter's Daughter	Zhou Jiayi	Tracy Chou	Zuer is Ai's rebellious daughter who travels to New York to embark on IVF treatment with her girlfriend Jiayi.	Taiwan	
2024	Drive-Away Dolls	Jamie	Margaret Qualley	After her girlfriend Sukie ends their relationship, free-spirited and uninhibited Jamie goes on an impromptu road trip with Marian. Marian is Jamie's uptight best friend who agrees to let Jamie accompany her on her drive to Tallahassee, where her family lives. Sukie is a police officer. She breaks up with Jamie when she catches her cheating with another woman.	United States	
2024	Drive-Away Dolls	Marian	Geraldine Viswanathan	After her girlfriend Sukie ends their relationship, free-spirited and uninhibited Jamie goes on an impromptu road trip with Marian. Marian is Jamie's uptight best friend who agrees to let Jamie accompany her on her drive to Tallahassee, where her family lives. Sukie is a police officer. She breaks up with Jamie when she catches her cheating with another woman.	United States	
2024	Drive-Away Dolls	Sukie	Beanie Feldstein	After her girlfriend Sukie ends their relationship, free-spirited and uninhibited Jamie goes on an impromptu road trip with Marian. Marian is Jamie's uptight best friend who agrees to let Jamie accompany her on her drive to Tallahassee, where her family lives. Sukie is a police officer. She breaks up with Jamie when she catches her cheating with another woman.	United States	
2024	I Saw the TV Glow	Maddy	Jack Haven (Note: Name changed after film release.)	Maddy introduces Owen to The Pink Opaque.	United States	
2024	In the Summers	Carmen	Emma Ramos	Carmen owns a lesbian bar and is Vicente's lifelong friend. Violeta will eventually seek support from Carmen as her own queer identity emerges.	United States, Mexico	
2024	Langue étrangère	Fanny	Lilith Grasmug	Fanny is a 17-year-old girl from Strasbourg who begins a relationship with her pen pal Lena during a foreign exchange in Leipzig.	France, Germany, Belgium	
2024	Langue étrangère	Lena	Josefa Heinsius	Fanny is a 17-year-old girl from Strasbourg who begins a relationship with her pen pal Lena during a foreign exchange in Leipzig.	France, Germany, Belgium	
2024	Love Lies Bleeding	Lou	Kristen Stewart	Lou is the manager of a gym. Daisy is Lou's former lover who is smitten with her.	United States	
2024	Love Lies Bleeding	Daisy	Anna Baryshnikov	Lou is the manager of a gym. Daisy is Lou's former lover who is smitten with her.	United States	
2024	Mean Girls	Janis 'Imi'ike	Auliʻi Cravalho	Janis came out to Regina in private, then was outed by her to their school.	United States	
2024	Miller's Girl	Winnie Black	Gideon Adlon	Winnie is Cairo's best friend.	United States	
2024	On Swift Horses	Sandra	Sasha Calle	Sandra is a nonconformist who does not hide her sexual orientation. She has an affair with her married neighbor Muriel.	United States	
2024	Prom Dates	Hannah	Julia Lester	After Hanna comes out to her best friend Jess, she goes in search of a lesbian dream date to go to the prom with. She has been attracted to Angie, a fellow high school classmate and out lesbian, and has her first same-sex sexual experience with her.	United States	
2024	Prom Dates	Angie	Terry Hu	After Hanna comes out to her best friend Jess, she goes in search of a lesbian dream date to go to the prom with. She has been attracted to Angie, a fellow high school classmate and out lesbian, and has her first same-sex sexual experience with her.	United States	
2024	The Ring	Alma	Joy Rieger	Alma is a television news researcher. She helps her estranged father in his search for the ring that his mother, after escaping from the Nazis, gave to a Hungarian soldier in return for their lives.	Israel	
2024	The Shameless	Renuka	Anasuya Sengupta	After killing a policeman, sex worker Renuka flees and hides in a brothel in northern India.	India, Switzerland, France, Bulgaria, Taiwan	
2024	Stress Positions	Vanessa	Amy Zimmer	Vanessa is Karla's girlfriend who wrote a book about her.	United States	
2024	Went Up the Hill	Jill	Vicky Krieps	Jill is the widow of Jack's mother.	Australia, New Zealand	
2024	What a Feeling	Fa	Proschat Madani	Fa is a sex-positive middle-aged woman of Iranian descent who falls in love with the doctor Marie Therese.	Austria	

=== 2025 ===
List
Year	Title	Character(s)	Actor	Notes	Country	Ref(s)
2025	After the Hunt	Margaret "Maggie" Resnick	Ayo Edebiri	Resnick is a young, wealthy philosophy student and Alma's protégée.	Italy, United States	
2025	Anniversary	Anna	Madeline Brewer	Anna is an acerbic comic and one of the four children of Georgetown professor Ellen and restaurateur Paul.	United States	
2025	Christy	Christy Martin	Sydney Sweeney	Biopic about the American female super welterweight professional boxer.	United States	
2025	Dreamers	Isio	Ronkẹ Adékoluẹjo	Isio is a Nigerian migrant who flees from her country due to being persecuted for her homosexuality.	United Kingdom	
2025	Echo Valley	Kate Garrett	Julianne Moore	Kate is a horse trainer on her farm, Echo Valley, in southern Pennsylvania. She is reeling from the loss of her wife Patty, who died in a riding accident. Leslie is Kate's best friend.	United States	
2025	Echo Valley	Patty	Kristina Valada-Viars	Kate is a horse trainer on her farm, Echo Valley, in southern Pennsylvania. She is reeling from the loss of her wife Patty, who died in a riding accident. Leslie is Kate's best friend.	United States	
2025	Echo Valley	Leslie Oliver	Fiona Shaw	Kate is a horse trainer on her farm, Echo Valley, in southern Pennsylvania. She is reeling from the loss of her wife Patty, who died in a riding accident. Leslie is Kate's best friend.	United States	
2025	Eleanor the Great	Nina Davis	Erin Kellyman	Nina is a college student who writes an article on Eleanor for her journalism class.	United States	
2025	Girlfriends	Lok	Fish Liew	Lok is a 34-year-old filmmaker from Macau whose girlfriend Bei is ready for them to be married. In her past identities, when Lok was 22 years-old, lived in Taipei, and went by the name of "Choi" she dated Kai Ching. At age 17, when she was a high school student in Macau and her name was "Yan", she had a crush on the sister of her classmate.	Macau, Taiwan, Hong Kong, Thailand	
2025	Girlfriends	Choi	Elizabeth Tang	Lok is a 34-year-old filmmaker from Macau whose girlfriend Bei is ready for them to be married. In her past identities, when Lok was 22 years-old, lived in Taipei, and went by the name of "Choi" she dated Kai Ching. At age 17, when she was a high school student in Macau and her name was "Yan", she had a crush on the sister of her classmate.	Macau, Taiwan, Hong Kong, Thailand	
2025	Girlfriends	Yan	Natalie Hsu	Lok is a 34-year-old filmmaker from Macau whose girlfriend Bei is ready for them to be married. In her past identities, when Lok was 22 years-old, lived in Taipei, and went by the name of "Choi" she dated Kai Ching. At age 17, when she was a high school student in Macau and her name was "Yan", she had a crush on the sister of her classmate.	Macau, Taiwan, Hong Kong, Thailand	
2025	Girlfriends	Bei	Jennifer Yu	Lok is a 34-year-old filmmaker from Macau whose girlfriend Bei is ready for them to be married. In her past identities, when Lok was 22 years-old, lived in Taipei, and went by the name of "Choi" she dated Kai Ching. At age 17, when she was a high school student in Macau and her name was "Yan", she had a crush on the sister of her classmate.	Macau, Taiwan, Hong Kong, Thailand	
2025	Girlfriends	Kai Ching	Han Ning	Lok is a 34-year-old filmmaker from Macau whose girlfriend Bei is ready for them to be married. In her past identities, when Lok was 22 years-old, lived in Taipei, and went by the name of "Choi" she dated Kai Ching. At age 17, when she was a high school student in Macau and her name was "Yan", she had a crush on the sister of her classmate.	Macau, Taiwan, Hong Kong, Thailand	
2025	The Hand That Rocks the Cradle	Polly Murphy	Maika Monroe	Polly becomes an au pair in order to infiltrate Caitlin's family life.	United States	
2025	Hedda	Eileen Lovborg	Nina Hoss	Hedda's former lover, Eileen is an author competing for the same professorship sought by Hedda's husband. The film is a reimagining of the 1891 play Hedda Gabler by Henrik Ibsen.	United States	
2025	Honey Don't!	Honey O'Donahue	Margaret Qualley	Honey is a private investigator who discovers a drug and sex trafficking operation being run by a church cult. MG is a police officer at the precinct. Honey and MG become sexually involved.	United States, United Kingdom	
2025	Honey Don't!	MG Falcone	Aubrey Plaza	Honey is a private investigator who discovers a drug and sex trafficking operation being run by a church cult. MG is a police officer at the precinct. Honey and MG become sexually involved.	United States, United Kingdom	
2025	Julian	Fleur	Nina Meurisse	Fleur and Julian are in a relationship and plan to marry in every country where same-sex marriage is legal.	Belgium, Netherlands	
2025	Julian	Julian	Laurence Roothooft	Fleur and Julian are in a relationship and plan to marry in every country where same-sex marriage is legal.	Belgium, Netherlands	
2025	The Little Sister	Fatima	Nadia Melliti	After Fatima starts university in Paris, she begins to come to terms with her sexuality and attraction to women.	France, Germany	
2025	Love Letters	Céline	Ella Rumpf	Shortly after the legalisation of same-sex marriage, Céline and Nadia are expecting their first child. While Nadia is pregnant, Céline begins to seek her legitimacy and place under the gaze of her friends, her mother, and the law.	France	
2025	Love Letters	Nadia	Monia Chokri	Shortly after the legalisation of same-sex marriage, Céline and Nadia are expecting their first child. While Nadia is pregnant, Céline begins to seek her legitimacy and place under the gaze of her friends, her mother, and the law.	France	
2025	Love Me Tender	Clémence	Vicky Krieps	Clémence comes out after separating from her husband. In response, he attempts to get full custody of their eight-year-old son.	France	
2025	Manok	Manok	Yang Mal-bok	Manok is the owner of the Lainbow Bar, a lesbian bar in Seoul. After her mother's death and a generational clash with younger members of the queer community, she returns to her conservative rural hometown, where she encounters homophobia. In response, Manok enters the race to become chief of the town.	South Korea	
2025	Montreal, My Beautiful	Feng Xia	Joan Chen	After a lifetime of dutifully obeying the traditions of her Chinese culture, family, and loveless marriage, Feng Xia's long-suppressed lesbianism is awakened when she meets Camille. She begins a secret affair with her.	Canada	
2025	Oh. What. Fun.	Taylor Clauster	Chloë Grace Moretz	Taylor is Claire's middle daughter. She is dating Donna at the beginning of the movie.	United States	
2025	Oh. What. Fun.	Donna	Devery Jacobs	Taylor is Claire's middle daughter. She is dating Donna at the beginning of the movie.	United States	
2025	Queens of the Dead	Kelsey	Jack Haven	Kelsey is the ditzy intern of Dre. Pops is the leader of a makeshift vigilante crew.	United States	
2025	Queens of the Dead	Pops	Margaret Cho	Kelsey is the ditzy intern of Dre. Pops is the leader of a makeshift vigilante crew.	United States	
2025	Rental Family	Yoshie Ikeda	Misato Morita	Closeted Yoshie hires Phillip as the groom in her fake Shinto wedding so that she can appease her traditionalist parents, be able to leave them, and move to Canada with her wife, Jun.	United States, Japan	
2025	Rental Family	Jun	Nanami Kawakami	Closeted Yoshie hires Phillip as the groom in her fake Shinto wedding so that she can appease her traditionalist parents, be able to leave them, and move to Canada with her wife, Jun.	United States, Japan	
2025	Stone Cold Fox	Fox	Kiernan Shipka	Fox escapes from an abusive commune, but returns to save her little sister who was kidnapped by its drug-dealing leader, Goldie.	United States	
2025	Summer's Camera	Summer	Kim Si-a	Summer falls in love for the first time when she meets Yeon-woo, the star soccer player at her school.	South Korea	
2025	We Kill Them All	Megan	Chloe McClay	When Megan and Lane arrive at a remote resort to meet with Megan's estranged father, they encounter criminals from his past who are looking for $2 million dollars that was hidden by him.	Canada	
2025	We Kill Them All	Lane	Emma Newton	When Megan and Lane arrive at a remote resort to meet with Megan's estranged father, they encounter criminals from his past who are looking for $2 million dollars that was hidden by him.	Canada	
2025	The Wedding Banquet	Angela	Kelly Marie Tran	Angela and Lee are a couple. Their gay friend Min proposes a green card marriage to Angela in exchange for funding Lee's fertility treatments. (Remake of the 1993 film of the same name).	United States	
2025	The Wedding Banquet	Lee	Lily Gladstone	Angela and Lee are a couple. Their gay friend Min proposes a green card marriage to Angela in exchange for funding Lee's fertility treatments. (Remake of the 1993 film of the same name).	United States	
2025	Whistle	Chrys Willet	Dafne Keen	Chrys and Ellie are high school students. Chrys finds an ancient Aztec relic, a whistle, in her school locker and blows it, unknowingly summoning death. The two find strength in being with each other and fight to survive together.	Canada, Ireland	
2025	Whistle	Ellie Gains	Sophie Nélisse	Chrys and Ellie are high school students. Chrys finds an ancient Aztec relic, a whistle, in her school locker and blows it, unknowingly summoning death. The two find strength in being with each other and fight to survive together.	Canada, Ireland	

=== 2026 ===
List
Year	Title	Character(s)	Actor	Notes	Country	Ref(s)
2026	Accused	Geetika Sen	Konkona Sen Sharma	Geetika, a celebrated gynaecological surgeon at a London hospital, is accused of sexual misconduct by a patient. Her wife, Meera, a pediatrician, tries to expose the truth.	India	
2026	Accused	Meera Mishra	Pratibha Ranta	Geetika, a celebrated gynaecological surgeon at a London hospital, is accused of sexual misconduct by a patient. Her wife, Meera, a pediatrician, tries to expose the truth.	India	
2026	Another Day	Pauline	Sara-Jeanne Drillaud	Pauline is a writer.	France	
2026	Barbara Forever	Herself	Barbara Hammer	Biographical documentary about pioneering avant-garde filmmaker Hammer, who explored the lesbian experience and recorded lesbian histories.	United States	
2026	Big Girls Don't Cry	Sid	Ani Palmer	Sid is a 14-year-old girl living in a small New Zealand town. She wants desperately to fit in with her older peers, particularly her crush Lana.	New Zealand	
2026	Girls Like Girls	Coley	Maya da Costa	Coley develops a crush on and befriends Sonya, a popular girl in a town of rural Oregon Coley has just moved to.	United States	
2026	In a Whisper	Lilia	Eya Bouteraa	Lilia is a Muslim woman who returns to her home in Tunisia for her uncle's funeral. There she tries to hide her sexuality to avoid conflict with her family.	France, Tunisia	
2026	Perfect	Mallory	Julia Fox	Mallory is a wealthy pregnant woman who is running away from her past. She falls in love with Kai, who starts her life over after a devastating breakup.	United States	
2026	Perfect	Kai	Ashley Moore	Mallory is a wealthy pregnant woman who is running away from her past. She falls in love with Kai, who starts her life over after a devastating breakup.	United States	

== See also ==
- List of lesbian characters in television
- List of lesbian characters in animation
- List of LGBT-related films
- List of LGBT-related films by year
