= Sheila Munyiva =

Kenyan actress and film director (born 1993)

- Born: March 27, 1993 (age 32); Nairobi, Kenya
- Occupations: Actress, film director
- Years active: 2018-present

Sheila Munyiva (born 27 March 1993) is a Kenyan actress and film director.

== Biography ==
Munyiva was born in 1993 in Nairobi. She grew up watching Hannah Montana and believed her skin should be fairer and hair straighter. She visited the UK frequently because her mother lived there. Munyiva studied to be a news anchor in college before switching her major to Film Production. After graduation, she worked on her script writing by taking part in a writer's masterclasses.

In 2018, Munyiva played Ziki, a free spirit who feels conflicted and torn between love and security, in Rafiki. The story is based on the novel Jambula Tree by the Ugandan writer Monica Arac de Nyeko and details the love that develops between two young women where homosexuality is forbidden. Even though she impressed director Wanuri Kahiu at the audition with her love of life, Munyiva was hesitant to take the role until a queer friend convinced her of its importance. The film was outlawed in Kenya, where homosexuality is illegal. Rafiki became the first Kenyan film to be screened at the Cannes Film Festival. Munyiva was featured on the Vogue UK edition for the best beauty looks and make up shoot at Cannes. Ann Hornaday of The Washington Post praised the "endearing, unforced chemistry" of Munyiva and co-star Samantha Mugatsia. Munyiva was nominated for best actress at the Africa Movie Academy Awards.

In 2019, Munyiva played medical officer Anna in the TV series Country Queen. In July 2019, she made her theatrical debut as Sarafina in the musical Sarafina!. Munyiva volunteers as a mentor for girls at a non-profit school in the slums of Kibera. She has directed several commercials in Kenya and is working on her first short film, Ngao, based on her childhood experiences.

== Filmography ==
- 2018: Rafiki as Ziki Okemi
- 2018: L'invité (TV series)
- 2019: Country Queen as Anna (TV series)
- 2023: Kizazi Moto: Generation Fire as Shiro (TV series)
