= Rafiki (film) =

2018 Kenyan film

- Theatrical release poster
- Directed by: Wanuri Kahiu
- Written by: Wanuri Kahiu; Jenna Cato Bass; Monica Arac de Nyeko
- Produced by: Steven Markovitz
- Starring: Samantha Mugatsia; Sheila Munyiva
- Cinematography: Christopher Wessels
- Edited by: Isabelle Dedieu Ronelle Loots
- Music by: Njoki Karu
- Production company: Big World Cinema
- Distributed by: Météore Films; Trigon-film; Film Movement; Cinemien; Edition Salzgeber; Olhar Distribuição; Senlis; Lesflicks; Salzgeber & Company Medien; The Criterion Channel
- Release dates: 9 May 2018 (Cannes); 23 September 2018 (Kenya)
- Running time: 83 minutes
- Country: Kenya
- Languages: English; Swahili
- Box office: $176,513

Rafiki (Swahili for 'friend') is a 2018 Kenyan drama film directed by Wanuri Kahiu. Rafiki is the story of romance that grows between two young women, Kena and Ziki, amidst family and political pressures around LGBTQ rights in Kenya. The film had its international premiere in the Un Certain Regard section at the 2018 Cannes Film Festival; it was the first Kenyan film to be screened at the festival.

== Plot ==
Kena helps her father John Mwaura run a small convenience store in Nairobi as he campaigns for a local election. Kena lives with her mother, who isn't really on speaking terms with John. Kena starts flirting with Ziki, a neighbourhood girl with colourful hair, who also happens to be the daughter of Peter Okemi, John's political rival. Kena and Ziki have a number of romantic dates, and quickly become very close, but there are tensions about displaying their affection in public because homosexuality is illegal in Kenya.

Ziki's friends get jealous that she is spending so much time with Kena, and when they attack Kena, Ziki defends her. Ziki takes Kena home to dress her wounds, but Ziki's mom catches them kissing. They run away together to hide, but are found by the town gossip, who brings an angry mob to attack the two girls. They are both arrested, and have to be picked up by their fathers. Ziki can no longer bear to see Kena, and her parents send her to live in London. John refuses to let Kena take the blame for what happened, even though it means forfeiting his chance at winning the election.

A few years later, Kena has fulfilled her dream to become a doctor and gets word that Ziki has returned to town. The film ends just as they are reunited: after all these years their love has not died.

== Cast ==
- Samantha Mugatsia as Kena Mwaura
- Sheila Munyiva as Ziki Okemi
- Neville Misati as Blacksta
- Nini Wacera as Mercy
- Jimmy Gathu as John Mwaura
- Charlie Karumi as Waireri
- Muthoni Gathecha as Mama Atim
- Dennis Musyoka as Peter Okemi
- Patricia Amira as Rose Okemi
- Nice Githinji as Nduta
- Patricia Kihoro as Josephine
- Githae Njogu as Pastor
- Mellen Aura as Elizabeth
- Derrick Assetto as Police #1
- Juliette Achieng' as Police #2
- Vitalis Waweru as Tom
- Leila Weema as Elizabeth's Friend
- Perscilla Wanjiku as Mrs Machoko
- Mary Wanjiku as Mrs. Ngugi
- Stephen Ruiru as Motorbike Passenger
- Mburu Kimani as Delivery Truck Driver
- Jane Wachu as Tuktuk Driver
- Justin Mirichii as Security Guard
- Edwin Owino as Otemi Rally Leader

== Production ==
The film is inspired by Ugandan Monica Arac de Nyeko's 2007 Caine Prize-winning short story "Jambula Tree". The film's title "Rafiki" (meaning "friend" in Swahili) was chosen, because due to homophobia in society, partners in a same-sex relationship often need to introduce their partner as a "friend", even if they are more than a friend.

It took several years to find funding to produce the film. The filmmakers initially tried to get funding in Kenya, but that was not possible, so they found co-production partners in Europe as well as financing from Lebanon and the United States. It was produced by Big World Cinema, a South African company.

Colours played an important role in the cinematography and art direction of the film. The filmmakers wanted to show that Nairobi is a very colourful city, which is why there is a lot of colour in the film. Scenes of intimacy between Kena and Ziki are shown in more tender pastel colours rather than the strong colour contrasts of the other scenes.

The film soundtracks featured several African artists such as Muthoni Drummer Queen, Chemutai Sage, Blinky Bill, Jaaz Odongo, Trina Mungai, Mumbi and Njoki Karu. The music supervisor and playlist curator was Patricia Kihoro, who also played Josephine.

It was Samantha Mugatsia's first film as an actress. Kahiu discovered her at a friend's party and asked her to audition for the role, as she had some of the characteristics of the character Kena. Sheila Munyiva had acted in films before.

Through the film, Wanuri expressed that African art needs to showcase hope and joy rather than hardship, terror and wars. She terms this as Afrobubblegum, and she is a strong advocate for the cultural movement. She also named her own Production Company as Afrobubblegum.

== Reception ==
On Metacritic the film has a score of 68 out of 100 based on reviews from 17 critics, indicating "generally favorable reviews". Additionally, its ratings on rotten tomatoes stand at 96% from 80 reviews. The film made its Dutch premiere at the International Film Festival Rotterdam in 2019, during its 48th edition. It also got screened at the Dublin International Film Festival in the same year.

=== Ban in Kenya ===
Rafiki was banned by the Kenya Film Classification Board (KFCB) "due to its homosexual theme and clear intent to promote lesbianism in Kenya contrary to the law". The Board asked the film director to change the ending, as it was too hopeful and positive. Kahiu refused, which led to the ban of the film. The KFCB warned that anyone found in possession of the film would be in breach of the law in Kenya, where gay sex is punishable by 14 years in jail. The ban raised international outrage by the supporters of LGBT rights.

The film's director, Wanuri Kahiu, sued Kenya's government, to allow the film to be screened and become eligible to be submitted as Kenya's entry for the Academy Award for Best Foreign Language Film at the 91st Academy Awards. She also sued for projected losses that would arise from the ban. On 21 September 2018, the Kenyan High Court judge, Wilfrida Okwany, temporarily lifted the ban on the film, allowing it to be screened in the country for seven days and meeting the minimum eligibility requirement. Once the ban was lifted, the film played to sold-out crowds at a cinema in Nairobi. It raked in millions of shillings during this period. Despite the concession, it was not selected as Kenya's submission in the Foreign Language Film category, with Supa Modo being sent instead.

=== Awards ===
Mugatsia won the Best Actress award at the 2019 FESPACO in Ouagadougou, Burkina Faso for her portrayal of Kena.

The film won the Best Narrative feature at the Seattle Queer Film Festival in 2019. It also won the Silver Hugo award at the Chicago International Film Festival.

A comprehensive list of the Awards and Nominations Rafiki film has received over the past years is as follows:

== Awards and nominations ==
| Year | Awarding Organisation | Category | Result | Reference |
|---|---|---|---|---|
| 2018 | American Film Institute (AFI) Festival | Audience Award: New Auteurs | Nominated | |
| 2018 | Bratislava International Film Festival | Viewers' Choice Award | Won | |
| 2018 | Cannes Film Festival | Queer Palm | Nominated | |
| 2018 | Cannes Film Festival | Un Certain Regard | Nominated | |
| 2018 | Carthage Film Festival | Tanit d'Or: Narrative Feature Film | Nominated | |
| 2018 | Carthage Film Festival | Best Actress in a Leading Role: Samantha Mugatsia | Won | |
| 2018 | Carthage Film Festival | Best Music: Narrative Feature Film | Won | |
| 2018 | Chicago International Film Festival | Silver Q- Hugo | Won | |
| 2018 | Chicago International Film Festival | Gold Q- Hugo | Nominated | |
| 2018 | Durban International Film Festival | Best Film: International Competition | Nominated | |
| 2018 | LesGaiCineMad, Madrid International LGBT Film Festival | Jury Prize: Best Acting- Samantha Mugatsia | Won | |
| 2018 | LesGaiCineMad, Madrid International LGBT Film Festival | Audience Award: Best Feature Film | Won | |
| 2018 | LUCAS - International Festival of Films for Children and Young | Youngsters Award: Section 16+ | Won | |
| 2018 | LUCAS - International Festival of Films for Children and Young | Bridging The Borders Award | Won | |
| 2018 | Merlinka Festival | Jury Prize: Best Feature Film | Nominated | |
| 2018 | NewFest: New York's LGBT Film Festival | Audience Award: Narrative Feature | Won | |
| 2018 | Oslo Films from the South Festival | Audience Award | Nominated | |
| 2018 | Oslo Films from the South Festival | New Voices Award | Nominated | |
| 2018 | São Paulo International Film Festival | New Directors Competition: Best Film | Nominated | |
| 2018 | Seattle Queer Film Festival | Audience Award: Favorite Narrative Feature | Won | |
| 2018 | Seattle Queer Film Festival | Jury Award: Best Feature Film | Won | |
| 2018 | Sydney Film Festival | Audience Award: Best Narrative Feature | Third Place | |
| 2018 | Valladolid International Film Festival | Meeting Point: Best Feature Film | Nominated | |
| 2019 | Black Reel Awards | Outstanding World Cinema Motion Picture | Nominated | |
| 2019 | Dublin International Film Festival | Young Programmers Choice Award | Won | |
| 2019 | Pan African Film and Television Festival of Ouagadougou | Best Actress- Samantha Mugatsia | Won | |
| 2019 | Göteborg Film Festival | Dragon Award: International Competition | Nominated | |
| 2019 | Kingston Reelout Film Festival | Kim Renders Outstanding Performance Award: Outstanding Supporting Performance- Muthoni Gathecha | Nominated | |
| 2019 | Kingston Reelout Film Festival | Kim Renders Outstanding Performance Award: Outstanding Lead Performance- Neville Misati | Nominated | |
| 2019 | Kingston Reelout Film Festival | Kim Renders Outstanding Performance Award: Outstanding Lead Performance- Samantha Mugatsia | Won | |
| 2019 | Milan International Lesbian and Gay Film Festival | Grand Jury Award: Best Film | Won | |
| 2019 | Milan International Lesbian and Gay Film Festival | Special Jury Award: Best Feature Film- Cultweek | Won | |
| 2019 | Minneapolis St. Paul International Film Festival | Audience Choice Award: Images Of Africa- Fiction | Won | |
| 2019 | The Queerties | Queerty Indie Movie | Nominated | |
| 2019 | African Movie Academy Awards | Best Actress In a Leading Role- Sheila Munyiva | Nominated | |
| 2019 | African Movie Academy Awards | Best Actress In a Leading Role- Samantha Mugatsia | Nominated | |
| 2019 | African Movie Academy Awards | Ousmane Sembene Award: Best Film In an African Language | Won | |
| 2019 | African Movie Academy Awards | Best Editing- Isabelle Dedieu | Won | |
| 2019 | African Movie Academy Awards | Best Film- Steven Markovitz | Nominated | |
| 2019 | African Movie Academy Awards | Best Director- Wanuri Kahiu | Nominated | |
| 2019 | African Movie Academy Awards | Best Screenplay- Wanuri Kahiu, Jenna Cato Bass | Nominated | |
| 2019 | African Movie Academy Awards | Best Cinematography- Christopher Wessels | Nominated | |
| 2019 | African Movie Academy Awards | Best Costume Design- Wambui Thimba | Nominated | |
| 2019 | African Movie Academy Awards | Best Production Design- Arya Lalloo | Nominated | |
| 2020 | Chlotrudis Awards | Best Adapted Screenplay | Nominated | |
| 2020 | GLAAD Media Awards | Outstanding Film: Limited Release | Won | |
| 2024 | Vancouver International Film Festival | Official Selection | Nominated | |
