= Samantha Mugatsia =

Kenyan actress (born 1992)

- Born: 1992 (age 33–34); Nairobi, Kenya
- Education: Catholic University of Eastern Africa
- Occupation: Actress
- Years active: 2018-present

Samantha Mugatsia (born 1992) is a Kenyan actress.

== Biography ==
Mugatsia was born in 1992, the child of Grace Gitau. They grew up in Nairobi and served as the drummer for the band The Yellow Machine. They also did some modeling work. Mugatsia studied law at Catholic University of Eastern Africa, but put their studies on hold to begin their acting career. In November 2016, they were attending an artists' pop-in when they were introduced to film director Wanuri Kahiu, who told them she was writing a script and wanted to show Mugatsia. Even though they had never acted, Mugatsia accepted the role.

In 2018, Mugatsia played Kena Mwaura, one of the two leading characters, in Kahiu's Rafiki. The story is based on the novel Jambula Tree by the Ugandan writer Monica Arac de Nyeko and details the love that develops between two young women where homosexuality is forbidden. In order to prepare for the role, Mugatsia took several months of acting lessons and practiced using mirror exercises and mentally living in the character. The film was banned in Kenya, where homosexuality is illegal. Rafiki became the first Kenyan film to be screened at the Cannes Film Festival. Ann Hornaday of The Washington Post called Mugatsia's performance "quietly watchful." Mugatsia won the Best Actress award at the 2019 FESPACO festival in Ouagadougou, Burkina Faso for their portrayal of Kena. The ban on the film was briefly lifted after Kahiu filed a lawsuit, in order to be screened in Kenya to be eligible for the Academy Awards.

Mugatsia identifies as spiritual. They have refused to comment on their own sexuality, but are sympathetic to the LGBT community.

== Filmography ==
- 2018: Rafiki as Kena Mwaura
- 2018: L'invité
