= The Mark of the Angels – Miserere =

- La marque des anges – Miserere
- Directed by: Sylvain White
- Screenplay by: Laurent Turner; Sylvain White; Luc Bossi; Yann Mège
- Based on: Miserere (novel) by Jean-Christophe Grangé
- Produced by: Stéphane Sperry
- Starring: Gérard Depardieu; JoeyStarr
- Cinematography: Denis Rouden
- Edited by: Sébastien de Sainte Croix
- Music by: Max Richter
- Production companies: Liaison Films; Pathé; TF1 Films Production; Brio Films; Saga City (production company); Senator Film Produktion; DD Productions; uFilm
- Distributed by: Pathé
- Release date: June 26, 2013 (France)
- Running time: 105 minutes
- Countries: France; Belgium; Germany
- Languages: French; English; German; Arabic; Spanish
- Budget: $15.4 million
- Box office: $1.1 million

The Mark of the Angels – Miserere (French: La marque des anges – Miserere) is a 2013 French thriller film directed by Sylvain White and based on Jean-Christophe Grangé's 2008 novel Miserere. Headlined by Gérard Depardieu and JoeyStarr, the film is the fifth adaptation of a Grangé novel after The Crimson Rivers, Empire of the Wolves, The Stone Council and Flight of the Storks and the first for which Grangé himself did not collaborate on the screenplay. Instead, the novel was adapted by La Proie and La Chance de ma vie co-writers Laurent Turner and Luc Bossi in collaboration with director White and Yann Mège (Paris enquêtes criminelles).

The film, which benefitted from a large budget, deals with a series of mysterious murders, Nazism, private military companies and child abuse. It was poorly received by critics and failed to make an impact at the box office.

== Plot ==
In Paris, Lionel Kasdan, a retired BRI commander desperate to come back to action, investigates the strange murder of Wilhelm Goetz, a choir master and Chilean refugee found dead in his church with his eardrums blown out, surrounded by bloody children's footprints. Meanwhile, Captain Frank Salek, an Interpol agent on the verge of being suspended due to his erratic behavior, is on the trail of a secret organization specialized in kidnapping children. When he learns of Goetz's death, he establishes a link with his own investigation and reluctantly agrees to team up with Kasdan.

== Cast ==
- Gérard Depardieu as Lionel Kasdan
- JoeyStarr as Frank Salek
- Rüdiger Vogler as Franz Hartmann
- Helena Noguerra as Angela Colson
- Marthe Keller as Laura Bernheim
- Thierry Lhermitte as Vernoux
- Ivan Franěk as Vargos
- Thom Hoffman as Sean Singleton
- Corinne Masiero as Monique Mendez
- Mathieu Carrière as Peter Hansen
- Jimmy Jean-Louis as Puyferrat
- Lizzie Brocheré as Dounia
- Fatima Adoum as Journalist
- Mathis Touré as Salek child

== Production ==
=== Development ===
The Mark of the Angels – Miserere marks Franco-American director Sylvain White's first French film, as all his prior works are American productions. Producer Stéphane Sperry claims he specifically looked for a foreigner to helm the picture, as he felt a French director would be unable to properly adapt Jean-Christophe Grangé's work to the screen. White praised the novel, saying Grangé transcribed the feeling and atmosphere of his universe very clearly, and was given a 15 million Euro budget, culled from French, Belgian and German production companies.

=== Casting ===
Gérard Moulévrier served as the casting director for the film. Gérard Depardieu plays the widowed retired cop Lionel Kasdan while rapper-turned-actor JoeyStarr plays his reluctant hot-headed partner Frank Salek. Starr's character was significantly changed from the novel, where he was a Child Protection Unit agent of Russian ethnicity called Cédric Volokine, a far cry from Starr's Martinican origins. Similarly, Kasdan's Armenian origins are highlighted in the novel but go unmentioned in the film. In an interview promoting the film, Sperry said Depardieu was among the only three or four bankable French actors that could play a retired policeman, and that he was the first to be approached. Sylvain White says that while he was unsure if partnering up Depardieu and Starr would be very easy or very hard on set, he knew it would one way or the other make for an interesting pairing. Starr admits being nervous at acting opposite the celebrated thespian, but says Depardieu immediately put him at ease and that their partnership was very comfortable, without egos coming into play, going on to call the older actor a paternal figure and mentor of sorts. Depardieu himself compared Starr to his deceased son. Starr hadn't read any of Grangé's novels upon being sent the script, being familiar only with the prior film adaptations. He proceed to watch all of Sylvain White's films before meeting him, much to White's surprise.

Among the supporting cast, Belgian actress Helena Noguerra plays Salek's Interpol direct supervisor and his former partner and lover Angela Colson. Like Starr, Noguerra was unfamiliar with Grangé's work and was attracted to the role as it was different than what was usually sent her way. Swiss actress Marthe Keller plays Laura Bernheim, a Chilean activist of German origin dedicated to fighting evil in all its forms. Keller had notably acted in Marathon Man, a 1976 film that heavily influenced Jean-Christophe Grangé to write the novel. German actor Rüdiger Vogler plays Franz Hartmann, one of the film's antagonists, Mathieu Carrière plays Peter Hansen, a Chilean activist that Kasdan and Salek consult, Haitian Jimmy Jean-Louis as a crime scene investigator who keeps Kasdan in the loop of things and Thierry Lhermitte plays Vernoux, Kasdan's former boss in charge of the official investigation. TF1 news anchor Claire Chazal has an extended role as herself, appearing throughout the film in news reports regarding Blackstream, an Academi-style private military company, and interviewing Marthe Keller's character, Dutch actor Thom Hoffman plays Sean Singleton, Blackstream's CEO and Lizzie Brocheré has a role as a lawyer Kasdan and Salek question.

=== Filming ===
Principal photography began on March 26, 2012, and lasted for 55 days with the Alexa Studio, making it the first French film to use the camera. An incident occurred on the very first day of shooting when a stuntman lost control of his motorcycle and fell in the Seine. Sylvain White described the film as very different from anything he'd done from before and was very hand-on throughout filming, even acting as the camera operator for some shots. The film was shot almost entirely on location, approximately 60% in and around Paris, 30% in Belgium and Germany and 10% in Morocco. The École d'Architecture Marne-la-Vallée in Champs-sur-Marne was used for the interiors of Interpol's Lyon headquarters, while the Assumption Colony's concert hall was shot in the French Communist Party's headquarters in Paris, which has been used in many other films, including two others in 2013, such as Mood Indigo. In addition the Church of Saint-Séverin served as the location for the first murder, a scene between Depardieu and Keller occurs at the Paris–Le Bourget Airport, Depardieu investigates at the Mémorial de la Shoah and the bar "Aux Folies" in Belleville, while is apartment is located at Les Olympiades. Emmy-winning production designer Albrecht Konrad worked on the film. A physiotherapist was present on the set in case of injuries. A fight scene in a hospital involving JoeyStarr required a full day's shoot. The Mark of the Angels – Miserere is majoritarily in French, with some subtilted Arabic dialogue in the Moroccan opening and a significant amount of English and German as well as some Spanish in the third act.

=== Music ===
La marque des anges – Miserere

Soundtrack album by Max Richter
- Released: June 24, 2013
- Genre: Soundtrack
- Length: 66:41
- Label: Kuskus

British composer Max Richter was hired for the film's score. He'd notably previously composed the score for Sarah's Key, directed by Gilles Paquet-Brenner, whose previous film Walled In was co-written by Sylvain White. White also uses the tune Through Tears of Joy, by Orchestra Lunatica, which he'd previously used in his previous film The Losers. Gregorio Allegri's religious chant Miserere gives its title to the book, and was moved as a subtitle for the film. The piece plays into the plot and as such is used throughout the picture. A digital download release of the soundtrack was released on June 24, 2013, on the Kuskus label and can be purchased on platforms such as Amazon UK and iTunes.

No.	Title	Artist	Length
1.	"Miserere Mei, Deus" (Gregorio Allegri)	Boys Air Choir	6:01
2.	"Red Drugs"	Tomandandy	6:22
3.	"Through Tears of Joy"	Orchestra Lunatica	8:26
4.	"Christ lag in Todesbanden in E Minor, BWV 4: Verse II. Den Tod niemand zwingen kunnt" (Johann Sebastian Bach)	Maria Jung	4:30
5.	"Mythologies"	Max Richter	1:22
6.	"Biography"	Max Richter	2:41
7.	"Chronology"	Max Richter	3:11
8.	"In the Midst of My Life"	Max Richter	2:27
9.	"The Empty House"	Max Richter	1:20
10.	"Prehistory"	Max Richter	4:14
11.	"Symbolism"	Max Richter	3:28
12.	"Vox"	Max Richter	2:40
13.	"Brother and Sister"	Max Richter	1:14
14.	"The Diary"	Max Richter	1:59
15.	"Discovery Journey"	Max Richter	1:47
16.	"The Assassins Journey"	Max Richter	0:56
17.	"Pursuit"	Max Richter	3:13
18.	"The Concert"	Max Richter	2:27
19.	"Vox Clamabant"	Max Richter	1:13
20.	"Summa"	Max Richter	7:10
Total length:			1:06:41

== Release ==
=== Promotion ===
Pathé released a 48-second teaser trailer on February 28, 2013, before unveiling the full trailer a month and a half later on March 14. In addition, Pathé made five minute-long excerpts available online a month before the film's release and the novel was retitled and given a new cover on June 13 to tie into the film. Ducati used the film to promote its Ducati Diavel motorcycle, driven by JoeyStarr's character. Gérard Depardieu being busy in Chechnya shooting Turquoise at the time of release, JoeyStarr shouldered most of the promotional duties, appearing on Touche Pas à mon Poste!, M, Le magazine du Monde, RMC and RFI among others. Depardieu was slated for an interview with i-Télé journalist Elena Volochine while working on Turquoise, but it never occurred as when Volochine arrived, the actor called her a "bitch" and told her to "go fuck herself".

=== Theatrical run ===
The film saw a wide release in France on June 26, 2013, in 280 theaters, which dropped to 267 in its second week. Uncharacteristically, the film wasn't released simultaneously in Belgium and is instead expected to premiere in the country on September 4. Sales are handled by Pathé International.

== Reception ==
=== Box office performance ===
The film made 397,163 Euros in its opening weekend, debuting at the tenth spot in the French box office, the third highest-grossing of the week's new releases after Despicable Me 2 and The Internship. By the end of the first week, 113,494 tickets had been sold. Sales plummeted in the second week, dropping 52.7%, with the film falling down to the fifteenth spot, bringing the total gross to 944,818 Euros, with only 36,189 additional moviegoers. To date, less than 150,000 tickets for the film have been sold.

=== Critical response ===
Professional ratings
Review scores
Source	Rating
Télé 7 Jours	3/5 stars
Le Parisien	2/5 stars
Les Fiches du Cinéma	2/5 stars
Metro	2/5 stars
Ecran Large	2/5 stars
L'Express	1.5/5 stars
TéléCinéObs	1/5 stars
Télérama	1/5 stars

The Mark of the Angels – Miserere received mixed, mostly negative reviews from critics, with AlloCiné's aggregator granting a 1.9 on 5 average based on 8 reviews. Common positive points include the chemistry between Gérard Depardieu and JoeyStarr and the action scenes while common negative points include a lack of suspense and a silly, incoherent script. Several reviewers also pointed out similarities to The Crimson Rivers, the first screen adaptation of a Grangé novel.

Among the most positive was from Télé 7 Jours critic Viviane Pescheux, who was disappointed by the ending but enjoyed the "spectacular" action scenes and the pairing of Gérard Depardieu and JoeyStarr and from Jean-Pierre Lacomme in Le Journal du Dimanche, who also praised the leads and called the film "as solid as it is efficient". For RTS Info, Caryl Bussy was also quite positive about the two stars and opined that fans of the novel wouldn't be disappointed. Hubert Lizé of Le Parisien also enjoyed the pairing but felt the film paled in comparison to Grangé's novel and ultimately fell flat. In Les Fiches du Cinéma, Michael Ghennam appreciated the film's 1970s atmosphere but thought it offered no surprises. Writing for Metro, Mehdi Omaïs thought the adaptation was scholarly, incoherent and lacked suspense. Conversely, Ecran Large's Laurent Pécha says he was pleasantly surprised, praising the two leads and the editing and comparing the film favorably to past Grangé adaptations. Julien Welter of L'Express conceded that the film started well, but felt it eventually turned into a "silly esoteric hodgepodge", a sentiment echoed by Télérama critic Nicolas Didier. In TéléCinéObs, Sophie Grassin gave Sylvain White credit for some "more or less spectacular" action scenes but was disappointed he didn't do much with his actors. Similarly, Charles Martin lamented in La Voix du Nord the missed opportunity of having Deparideu and Starr together, deeming the film "cold and passionless". Writing for Le Monde, Jacques Mandelbaum was particularly negative, calling the script dated, the dialogue awkward, the directing flat and the actors lost, likening the result to a shipwreck.

In the sole English language review, for The Hollywood Reporter, Jordan Mintzer called the film a "mildly entertaining, extremely heavy-handed conspiracy thriller [...] that, despite some lively performances, never congeals into a convincing whole", praising Gérard Depardieu and JoeyStarr, along with the editing, cinematography and a couple of action scenes but concluded that "White never builds a palpable sense of danger or enough staggering set-pieces to add substance to all the recycled goods".

== See also ==
- Colonia Dignidad, the real life organization which inspired the Colony in the film and novel
- Paul Schäfer, the founder of Colonia Dignidad
- Josef Mengele, the Nazi war criminal who served as inspiration for the film's villain, along with Schäfer
- Marathon Man, a 1976 film the novel's author Jean-Christophe Grangé was inspired by, also starring Marthe Keller
- Miserere, Gregorio Allegri's 17th century music piece that plays an important part in the film and the novel
