= Stéphane Bak =

French actor and radio host (born 1996)

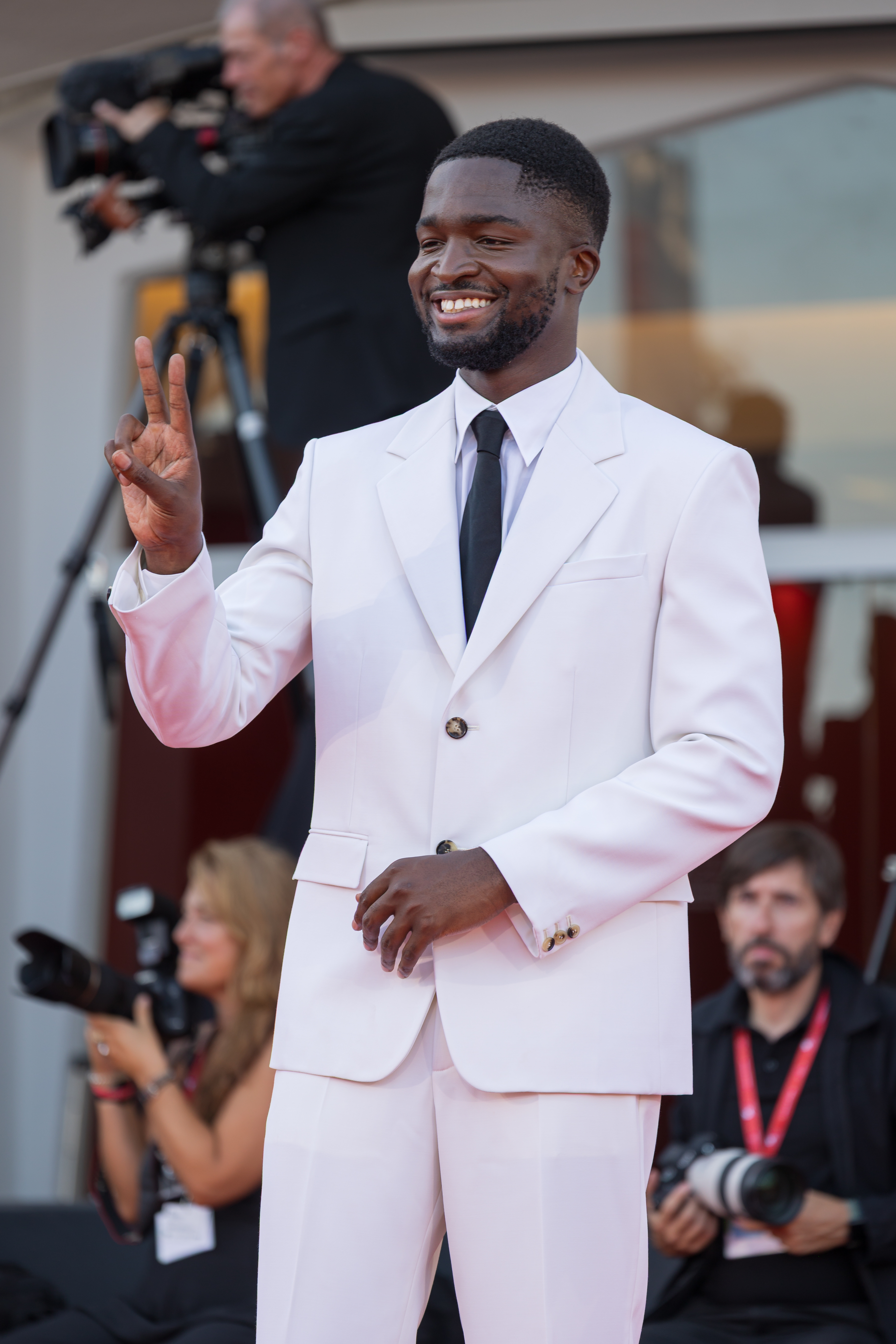
- Bak in 2025
- Born: 19 September 1996 (age 29); Le Blanc-Mesnil, Seine-Saint-Denis, France
- Occupations: Actor; comedian
- Years active: 2010–present

Stéphane Bak (born 19 September 1996) is a French actor and comedian of Congolese origin. He initially pursued a career in comedy and was showcased as the "youngest comedian in France". He further transitioned to cinema. He notably played the lead role in Twist in Bamako (2021) and achieved critical acclaim in Mother and Son (2023). He appeared in three of Wes Anderson's films, The French Dispatch (2021), Asteroid City (2023) and The Phoenician Scheme (2025).

Bak also lends his voice to Miles Morales in the French version of Spider-Man: Into the Spider-Verse (2018), Oscar 2019 for Best Animated Feature Film, and Spider-Man: Across the Spider-Verse (2023). Furthermore, he is the face of the haute couture brand Loewe and Cartier's ambassador for haute jewelry.

== Early life ==
Bak is of Congolese origin; and the son of a baggage handler at Paris's Charles de Gaulle Airport and a customer service agent, both of whom emigrated from Zaire to France in the 1980s. The future actor grew up with his six siblings in the town of Le Blanc-Mesnil (Seine-Saint-Denis), residing there until the age of 21, within the Tilleuls neighborhood, situated in a sensitive urban area.

In 2011, he was expelled from Nelson Mandela Middle School (Le Blanc-Mesnil) due to numerous disciplinary issues and subsequently continued his education through correspondence courses. He obtained authorization from the DDASS to start working at the age of 14, allowing him to embark on his career in the field of humor. In 2012, he received acting training at the Cours Florent.

Following this, his career gradually shifted towards the profession of an actor.

== Career ==
=== Comedy shows and audiovisual presence (2010–2014) ===
Bak started his career as a stand-up comedian in December 2010, performing in the small clubs of Paris. After being denied admittance to the Comedy Club (owned by Jamel Debbouze) due to his age, he met Emmanuel Smadja, the director of the Parisien café-theater Le Pranzo. He offered him the opportunity to perform there and to present his debut sketch My name is Stephane Bak. He performed in many other places, most notably at Le Palace and at Théâtre Trévise. He gained some reputation and the unofficial title of "the youngest comedian in France".

In 2011, he took part in the Montreux Comedy Festival with Les Chevaliers du fiel. He also performed twice at the Grand Rex: first as a guest of Jamel Debbouze as part of the Carte blanche à Jamel Debbouze show, and during the Rire ensemble contre racisme (Laughing together against racism) broadcast on France 2 in prime time before two million viewers. On 8 October 2011, less than a year into his career, he took part in the Nuit de l'Outre-mer on stage at the Accor Arena in Paris. He also appeared at Casino de Paris for "Le concert solidaire" organized in September 2012 for the 30th anniversary of the organization Handicap International.

Spotted by the creators of the show Bref who took him under their wing, he participated in the episode "Bref. J'ai eu 30 ans", alongside Kyan Khojandi. In May 2012, he had a daily presence on Le Grand Journal during the Cannes Film Festival, where he presented short sketches. This marked the beginning of his collaboration with Le Grand Journal, as he officially joined the team during the following summer. He took on the role of hosting a humorous segment called Bakstage, in which he portrayed behind-the-scenes antics at the program, interacting with contributors and guests. His television journey continued in January 2014 when he became a part of the team for France 2's new prime-time access program, L'Émission pour tous, hosted by Laurent Ruquier. In this role, he provided a daily humorous segment.

Simultaneously, he made appearances in two radio programs, on Europe 1 from 2012 to 2014, and on Virgin Radio from 2013 to 2014.

=== Debut as an actor (2014–2017) ===
Bak made his initial foray into the world of cinema in 2013, at the age of 16. He took one supporting roles in two comedies: Anthony Marciano's Les gamins and Pierre-François Martin-Laval's Serial Teachers. At this point, he expressed his desire for career growth and diversification, aiming to move beyond comedy projects and shed the label of a comedian.

In 2014, he played Max in Once in a Lifetime, a dramatic comedy directed by Marie-Castille Mention-Schaar. The film tells the story of a second-year class preparing for the National Contest of Resistance and Deportation, and it received positive reviews from critics. In October 2014, the movie was screened at the Élysée Palace in the presence of the President of the Republic, François Hollande.

He is the main actor of the music video The Girl Is Mine by 99 Souls featuring Destiny's Child and Brandy. Released in November 2015, the video was nominated at the 2016 MTV Video Music Awards in the "Best Electronic Video" category.

In 2016, he became part of the cast of Elle, directed by Paul Verhoeven, which won the César Award for Best Film in 2017. He also played the role of Jules in Team Spirit, directed by Christophe Barratier, which centered on the story of Jérôme Kerviel. He achieved his first leading role in 2017 in Seuls, a film directed by David Moreau, where he portrayed Dodji in the cinematic adaptation of the comic book.

=== An expanding career (2018–present) ===
In 2018, Bak had a lead role as Private Faustin, in Joel Karekezi's The Mercy of the Jungle, which had its debut at the Toronto International Film Festival on September 8. Bak was selected as one of eight rising stars at the festival, through the yearly "TIFF Rising Star" programme. He also voiced Miles Morales / Spider-Man for the French dub of Peter Ramsey's Spider-Man: Into the Spider-Verse. The film won the Academy Award for Best Animated Feature in 2019.

In 2019, he appeared as Bilal in André Téchiné's drama Farewell to the Night, which premiered at the Berlin International Film Festival on 12 February. That same year Bak starred alongside Fionn Whitehead in Sebastian Schipper's film Roads, which was previously known as Caravan. The film had its world premiere at the 2019 Tribeca Film Festival.

He played a significant role in Tokyo Shaking, directed by Olivier Peyon, where he shared the screen with Karine Viard. The director entrusted him with the character of Amani, an intern in the Japanese branch of a major French bank, set against the backdrop of Japan's challenges in the wake of the 2011 tsunami and the Fukushima nuclear accident. The film was released in theaters in 2021.

In 2022, Bak took on the leading role alongside Alice Da Luz in Dancing the Twist in Bamako, a film directed by Robert Guédiguian set during the era of socialist Mali under Modibo Keita. The film's production, which began in February 2020 in Senegal, was interrupted due to the COVID-19 pandemic but resumed in November 2020. Bak portrayed the character of Samba, a socialist revolutionary whose political and romantic ideals are under threat.

During the same year, Stéphane Bak appeared in two films selected for the official competition at the Cannes Film Festival. He took on the leading role in Mother and Son, a film directed by Léonor Seraille, in which he portrayed the character of Jean. The film is a drama that reflects the struggles of a fractured and blended family and received critical acclaim, becoming a critical success. He also made an appearance in Novembre, directed by Cédric Jiménez, a film that revolves around the pursuit of the terrorists from the November 13th terraces commando attack. Bak played the role of Djibril, an officer in the SDAT (Sub-Directorate of Anti-Terrorism). The film was a commercial success, ranking second in the French box office for the year 2022 with over three million admissions.

In 2023, he reprised his role as Miles Morales in the French version Spider-Man: Across the Spider-Verse. Bak also continued his collaboration with Wes Anderson by appearing in Asteroid City, a film included in the official selection of the Cannes Film Festival. Additionally, he joined André Téchiné again in Soul Mates, alongside Noémie Merlant and Benjamin Voisin. Furthermore, he served as a jury member at the 49th American Film Festival of Deauville, presided over by Guillaume Canet.

== Fashion ==
Bak acts as brand ambassador for Spanish fashion brand Loewe. He modelled alongside Josh O'Connor, for their Spring Summer 2023 campaign.

== Filmography ==
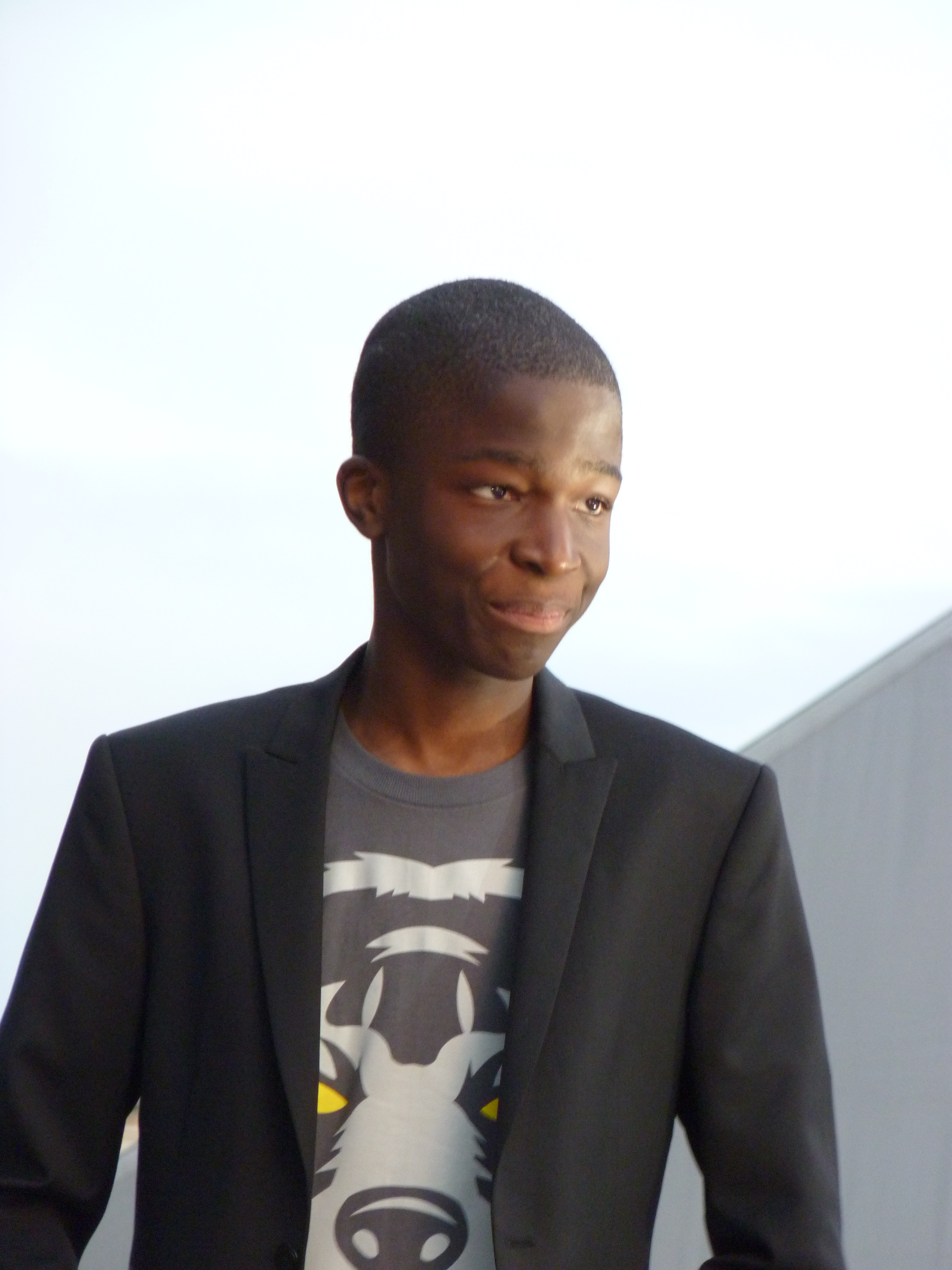
Bak at the 2012 Cannes Film Festival

=== Film ===
Key
†	Denotes films that have not yet been released

Year	Title	Role	Director	Notes
2013	Serial Teachers	Student	Pierre-François Martin-Laval	
2013	Les gamins	Parking Lot Kid	Anthony Marciano	Comedy film
2014	Once in a Lifetime	Max	Marie-Castille Mention-Schaar	Comedy / Drama
2016	Elle	Omar	Paul Verhoeven	Crime / Drama / Thriller
2016	Team Spirit	Jules	Christopher Barratier	Biography / Drama / Thriller
2016	Heaven Will Wait	Copain/Friend	Marie-Castille Mention-Schaar	Drama
2017	Alone	Dodji	David Moreau	
2018	The Mercy of the Jungle	Private Faustin	Joel Karekezi	Crime / Drama / War
2018	Spider-Man: Into the Spider-Verse	Miles Morales / Spider-Man	Bob Persichetti; Peter Ramsey; Rodney Rothman	Voice of the French dub
2019	Farewell to the Night	Bilal	André Téchiné	Drama
2019	Roads	William	Sebastian Schipper	Formerly Caravan
2021	Tokyo Shaking	Amani Sassou	Olivier Peyon	
2021	The French Dispatch	Communications Specialist	Wes Anderson	Comedy / Drama / Romance
2021	Mali Twist	Samba	Robert Guédiguian	
2022	Novembre	Djibril	Cédric Jimenez	Crime / Drama / Thriller
2022	Mother and Son	Jean	Léonor Serraille	Drama
2023	Soul Mates	Franck Dawaga	André Téchiné	Drama
2023	Asteroid City	Student	Wes Anderson	Comedy / Drama / Romance
2023	Spider-Man: Across the Spider-Verse	Miles Morales / Spider-Man	Joaquim Dos Santos; Kemp Powers; Justin K. Thompson	Voice of the French dub
2025	The Phoenician Scheme	Radical Freedom Militia Corps 1	Wes Anderson	Comedy / Espionage

=== Music videos ===
Year	Artist	Title	Role
2014	Black M	Mme Pavoshko	Student
2015	99 Souls	The Girl Is Mine	Main actor
