= Simple Passion =

2020 film by Danielle Arbid

- Theatrical release poster
- French: Passion simple
- Directed by: Danielle Arbid
- Screenplay by: Danielle Arbid
- Based on: Simple Passion by Annie Ernaux
- Produced by: David Thion; Philippe Martin
- Starring: Laetitia Dosch; Sergei Polunin; Lou-Teymour Thion; Caroline Ducey; Grégoire Colin; Slimane Dazi
- Cinematography: Pascale Granel
- Edited by: Thomas Marchand
- Production companies: Les Films Pelléas; Versus Production; Auvergne Rhône-Alpes Cinéma; Proximus
- Distributed by: Pyramide Distribution (France); O'Brother Distribution (Belgium)
- Release dates: 19 September 2020 (TIFF); 11 August 2021 (France and Belgium)
- Running time: 96 minutes
- Countries: France; Belgium
- Languages: French; English
- Budget: $2.5 million
- Box office: $318,494

Simple Passion (French: Passion simple) is a 2020 erotic drama film written and directed by Danielle Arbid, based on the 1992 autobiographical novel of the same name by Annie Ernaux. The film stars Laetitia Dosch and Sergei Polunin, with Lou-Teymour Thion, Caroline Ducey, Grégoire Colin and Slimane Dazi. The plot follows a divorced university professor (Dosch) who begins an intense affair with a younger, married diplomat (Polunin).

The film had its world premiere at the Toronto International Film Festival on 19 September 2020 as part of the Industry Selects program. It was released theatrically on 11 August 2021 in France by Pyramide Distribution and in Belgium by O'Brother Distribution. The film received mixed reviews from critics, who criticised Arbid's screenplay, Polunin's performance and the soundtrack, but praised Dosch's performance and the cinematography.

== Plot ==
Literature professor and divorced mother Hélène lives in the Paris suburbs with her preteen son, Paul. She begins a passionate affair with Alexandre, a younger, married Russian diplomat stationed at the Russian Embassy who she met at a party in Porto. The two regularly meet for afternoon trysts at her house. Alexandre, who is usually cold and evasive, only visits Hélène when it suits him and instructs her to never contact him, especially when he goes away to spend time with his wife. She often finds herself waiting to hear from him, and over time, she becomes increasingly obsessed with him.

Hélène's best friend and confidant, Anita, believes that their affair is doomed to fail, since Alexandre is married and will return to Russia, while suggesting that Hélène is "in love with love itself". When Alexandre announces he will be away for a few weeks with his wife, Hélène takes a reluctant Paul on an impromptu trip to Florence. While visiting a church alone, she cries and is consoled by a stranger. Back in Paris, Hélène receives a call from Alexandre, asking to meet. After sex, they have a brief argument when he berates her for wearing a short skirt.

Alexandre occasionally shares personal details about himself with Hélène, telling her about his parents and revealing that he lives on Tverskaya Street in Moscow. In a subsequent encounter, Hélène professes her love for Alexandre during intercourse, though he does not respond. Shortly afterwards, when Alexandre again tells Hélène not to contact him as he will be away with his wife, she begs him to stay, but her behaviour annoys him and he leaves. Following a conversation with Anita, who reprimanded Hélène for being too submissive to Alexandre, Hélène refuses to let him in during his next visit, but she is unable to resist him and the two make out.

After not hearing from Alexandre for a while, Hélène calls the embassy and he arranges to meet her in a hotel room the following day. When he fails to show up, she phones his office but is informed that he has returned to Moscow. She subsequently sinks into depression, to the point of neglecting Paul and her work commitments. Hélène's ex-husband, who stops by to collect Paul, harshly reminds her of her responsibilities as a mother. During a session with her psychiatrist, she confesses that she flew to Moscow for a day, roaming around Tverskaya Street in hopes of running into Alexandre.

Eight months later, Hélène watches Paul play football, having seemingly regained control of her life. One night, she is surprised when Alexandre calls her to announce he is coming by. In order to be alone with him, she quickly sends Paul to stay at a friend's house for the night. After they have sex, Hélène offers to drive Alexandre back to his hotel. En route, she wonders if they will see each other again, presuming that their affair is over. Upon arriving at the hotel, he calls her "my love" and goes inside. A teary-eyed Hélène watches as Alexandre disappears from sight, then leaves.

== Cast ==
- Laetitia Dosch as Hélène
- Sergei Polunin as Alexandre
- Lou-Teymour Thion as Paul
- Caroline Ducey as Anita
- Grégoire Colin as Hélène's ex-husband
- Slimane Dazi as the psychiatrist

== Production ==
In May 2018, Vicky Krieps and Danila Kozlovsky were originally cast in the lead roles, before they were replaced in January 2019 by Laetitia Dosch and Sergei Polunin, respectively. Principal photography began on 19 January 2019 and concluded on 5 March of that year, with filming taking place in Paris and the surrounding region, as well as in Lyon, Florence and Moscow. It was shot on 16 mm film.

== Release ==
Simple Passion was originally set to premiere at the 2020 Cannes Film Festival, prior to its cancellation due to the COVID-19 pandemic. The film instead had its world premiere at the Toronto International Film Festival on 19 September 2020 as part of the Industry Selects program. It was also screened at the 68th San Sebastián International Film Festival, the 25th Busan International Film Festival, the 16th Zurich Film Festival, the 42nd Moscow International Film Festival, and the 2021 Sydney Film Festival.

The film was released theatrically on 11 August 2021 in France by Pyramide Distribution and in Belgium by O'Brother Distribution. It was made available to stream in the United Kingdom on Curzon Home Cinema on 5 February 2021, and was given a limited theatrical release in the United States on 21 January 2022 by Strand Releasing.

== Critical reception ==
On the review aggregator website Rotten Tomatoes, Simple Passion holds an approval rating of 59% based on 27 reviews, with an average rating of 6.3/10. The website's critics consensus reads, "Simple Passion's rather unremarkable story is elevated by Laetitia Dosch's outstanding work in the central role." Metacritic, which uses a weighted average, assigned the film a score of 57 out of 100, based on 11 critics, indicating "mixed or average" reviews.

Huw Oliver of Time Out, rating the film four out of five stars, wrote that although "[t]he only real slip is the soundtrack", "Dosch's charisma and Arbid's fluid style suffice to convey the full intensity of this particular histoire d'amour." Sophie Brown of Sight and Sound praised Arbid's direction and the soundtrack, while comparing the cinematography to that of director Éric Rohmer's 1980s films, particularly Boyfriends and Girlfriends (1987). Peter Bradshaw of The Guardian gave the film three out of five stars, dubbing it a "sensitive French study of erotic obsession". Rating the film eight out of ten, Kyle Bain of Film Threat complimented Pascale Granel's cinematography and the sex scenes, adding that "there is a lack of real substance throughout Simple Passion, but the sex manages to fill that void to a degree and keep the film afloat."

Guy Lodge of Variety viewed the film as "an imperfect but glassily compelling study of obsessive, finally debilitating desire that honors its source with an unblinking female gaze", although he criticised the soundtrack and found that "Arbid's storytelling starts circling a little repetitively" in the film's second half. Jonathan Romney of Screen Daily criticised the "leadenly unimaginative pop soundtrack" and stated, "While hardly avant-garde, the film displays considerable audacity, sexual and formal, but also a certain lifestyle glossiness – an uneasy balance that is likely to undermine its appeal either to the more discerning art-house crowd or to the niche sector of more mainstream Francophiles." Glenn Kenny of The New York Times wrote, "While keeping a stalwart female perspective, Simple Passion follows an arc so standard it could be called banal."

Graham Fuller of The Arts Desk commented, "It's a shame the tension created by [Hélène and Alexandre's] feverish pas de deux and the torturous aftermath is dissipated by the awful selection of non-diegetic pop songs added to the soundtrack." Katie Walsh of the Los Angeles Times concluded that "[t]here is potential to say so much more about sex, love, partnership, feminism and shifting sexual mores across cultures, but Simple Passion lets the bodies do the talking, and after a while, they run out of things to say." Diego Semerene of Slant Magazine gave the film one-and-a-half four stars and criticised Arbid's adaptation of Ernaux's novel, stating, "Instead of trying to translate Ernaux's uncanny ability to viscerally connect readers to Hélène's despair, through affect or mood, Arbid's film coldly relies on the novel's narrative situations".

Dosch garnered critical acclaim for her performance. Brown and Romney both praised her as "superb", while Bradshaw wrote that she "brings a wonderful humanity and sensitivity to the role". Lodge stated, "In her richest role since breaking out in 2017's Jeune Femme, [Dosch] holds nothing back physically, but it's her face, constantly registering shifting internal tides of desire, disappointment and devastation, that holds us." Christy Lemire of RogerEbert.com found that "Dosch's raw physical and emotional performance pulls us in and keeps us hooked." Tim Robey of The Daily Telegraph commented that "the power of Dosch's performance is such that you're utterly engrossed." On the other hand, Polunin's performance was received unfavourably by critics, who felt his acting was not on par with Dosch's.
