= Blood Red Rivers =

French 1998 novel by Jean-Christophe Grangé

- First edition cover
- Author: Jean-Christophe Grangé
- Original title: Les Rivières pourpres
- Translator: Ian Monk
- Language: French
- Genre: Crime novel
- Publisher: Albin Michel
- Publication date: 10 September 1998
- Publication place: France
- English publication date: 2 September 1999
- Media type: Print (Paperback)
- Pages: 416
- ISBN: 978-2-226-09331-8
- OCLC: 38498923

Blood Red Rivers (French: Les Rivières pourpres) is a crime novel by Jean-Christophe Grangé, set in the French Alps. First published in French in 1998, it appeared in September 1999 in an English translation by Ian Monk.

== Plot summary ==
Detective Superintendent Pierre Niemans, is sent to the small university town of Guernon in the French Alps to investigate a brutal murder. Niemans learns that the victim was a professor and the university's librarian, Remy Callois, and he seeks out a local ophthalmologist for an explanation regarding the removal of the victim’s eyes. Dr Cherneze, explains that the school's isolation led to inbreeding amongst the professors, with increasingly serious genetic disorders. Recently the trend has reversed, with the local village children becoming ill and the college babies remaining healthy, something that the local villagers blame on the faculty members.

Coincidentally Detective Inspector Max Kerkerian is in the nearby town of Sarzac investigating the desecration of the grave of Judith Herault, a girl who died in 1982, and the theft of her photos from the local primary school. The mother tells Kerkerian that at the faculty's hospital in Guernon, they were attacked by "demons" on their way back and when they fled, her husband and her daughter were killed in the road accident.

Niemans questions Fanny Ferreira Niemans breaks into the dead librarian's office and finds details on the faculty history. He discovers that the original faculty-staff were intellectuals who believed in creating a super-race based not on physical criteria but on intellectuality, and that was the real reason for their original inbreeding problems. Soon after, Fanny and Niemans discover a second body, murdered in the same ritualistic fashion inside a glacier.

Niemans meets Kerkerian at the victim’s home, as the latter thinks he violated the grave. Due to the body being endorned with glass eyes, Niemans returns back to Cherneze's practice. The doctor is already dead, and they almost catch the killer, who fights off Niemans and races away. They learn the prints on Niemans's gun belong to Judith Herault. Kerkerian goes back to search the grave in Sarzac, which is empty except for a picture. He returns with the photo from the grave and Niemans recognizes as Fanny.

On the way to her house, they narrowly avoid being run off the road by the Dean's son as they piece together the story: Due to the poor bloodlines and genetic mutations in the faculty's inbred offspring, the doctors at the hospital had been swapping healthy village children with the university children and Callois arranged the matches between both types of children in the college's breeding-program. Sertys, they deduce, must have swapped Fanny for one of the dead faculty babies while leaving her identical twin, Judith, with her birth family as a control subject. When Judith was brought to the hospital because of a broken wrist, her mother saw pictures of Fanny and realized that she was her stolen daughter. The family fled the hospital and were pursued by members of the faculty who caused the accident that killed the husband. The mother hid Judith and faked her death. As the mother slowly descended into madness and took refuge as a nun, Judith sought Fanny, who continued hiding her.

Once at Fanny's house they find the missing hands and eyes of the victims in her basement. Niemans gives the order to evacuate the university while he and Kerkerian travel up the mountain to find Fanny. The duo confront Fanny only to be set upon by Judith. She tells Fanny to kill Niemans and the ensuing gunfight triggers an avalanche. Judith is killed and the rest are buried in the snow until a rescue team arrives.

== Reception ==
The release of this book was a strong success in France with about 500,000 copies sold. This was the author's second book and made him famous In 2000 the movie adaptation became the number1 movie in France, which generated a new bump in the book's sales.

== Adaptations ==
In 2000, Blood Red Rivers was adapted into film as The Crimson Rivers, starring Jean Reno and Vincent Cassel. There was a cinema only sequel to this movie in 2004, "The Crimson Rivers II:Angels of the Apocalypse". The Crimson Rivers, a tv series following the novel and its adaptation first aired in 2018, starring Olivier Marchal and Erika Sainte.
