= Montparnasse Bienvenue =

Montparnasse Bienvenue may refer to:

- Montparnasse Bienvenue (film), a 2017 French comedy-drama
- Montparnasse–Bienvenüe station, a Paris Metro station
