= Marc Zinga =

Congolese-Belgian actor, singer and filmmaker

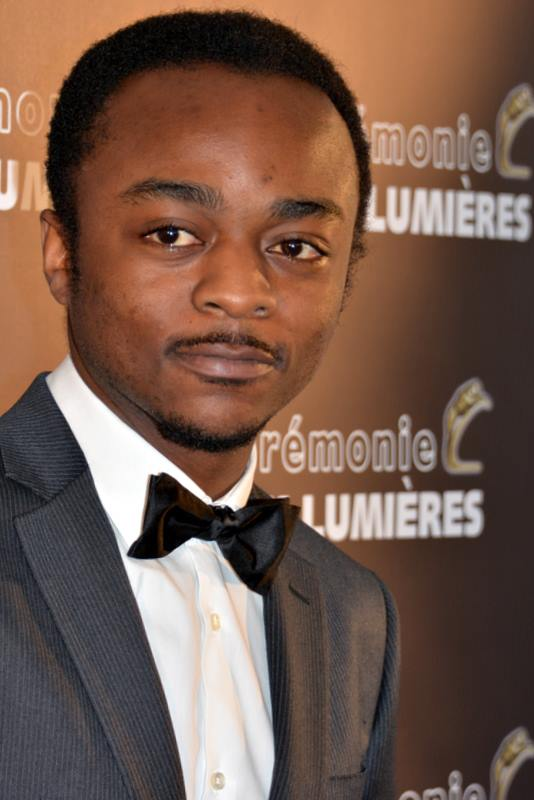
- Marc Zinga at the Lumière Awards 2015
- Born: 21 October 1984 (age 41); Likasi, Democratic Republic of the Congo
- Occupations: Actor, Singer, Film director, Screenwriter, Producer
- Years active: 2003–present

Marc Zinga (born 21 October 1984) is a Congolese-Belgian actor, singer and filmmaker. For his performance in May Allah Bless France, he was nominated for the César Award for Most Promising Actor.

== Early life ==
Born in Likasi, Democratic Republic of the Congo, Zinga moved to Belgium with his family at the age of five. He was one of the lead singers of the group The Peas Project between 2003 and 2011.

== Career ==
He began his acting career appearing in small film and television roles before landing major roles in the films Scouting for Zebras and May Allah Bless France! in 2014.

For his role in May Allah Bless France!, Zinga was nominated for the César Award for Most Promising Actor. In 2015, he received a Magritte Award for Most Promising Actor at the 5th Magritte Awards for his role in Zebras and, in 2019, the Best Actor Award at Pan African Film and Television Festival of Ouagadougou (Fespaco) for his role in the award-winning Rwandese film The Mercy of the Jungle.

In 2024, he received his fourth Magritte nomination, and second for Best Actor, for his role in Omen, a 2023 film directed by Belgian-Congolese rapper Baloji in his feature film debut. Zinga plays the lead role of Koffi, who returns to Lubumbashi after a 15-year absence.

== Theatre ==
Year	Title	Role	Director	Notes
2014	Le Roi Lear	Edmond	Christian Schiaretti	Théâtre National Populaire

== Filmography ==
=== As filmmaker ===
Year	Title	Notes
2013	Grand Garçon	Short; Director, Writer, Producer and Actor

=== As actor ===
Year	Title	Role	Director	Notes
2009	Mr. Nobody	Gay Man	Jaco Van Dormael	English language film
2009	Diamant 13	Ali Baba Mike	Gilles Béhat	
2009	Babelgium	Marc	Michael Havenith	Short
2010	L'heure bleue	The salesman	Michaël Bier & Alice De Vestele	Short
2011	De force	Dimitri Bonenfant	Frank Henry	
2011	Mister BOB	General Mobutu	Thomas Vincent	TV movie
2011	Goldman	Barman	Christophe Blanc	TV movie
2012	La clinique de l'amour !	Soldier	Artus de Penguern & Gábor Rassov	
2012	Spiral	Moussa Koné	Jean-Marc Brondolo, Manuel Boursinhac, ...	TV series (8 episodes)
2013	Je suis supporter du Standard	The player	Riton Liebman	
2013	Grand garçon	The black	Marc Zinga	Short
	Une Saison au Congo	Lumumba	Christian Schiaretti	Théâtre Nationale Populaire (Repeat in 2016)
2014	May Allah Bless France!	Régis	Abd al Malik	Nominated - César Award for Most Promising Actor; Nominated - Lumière Award for Best Male Revelation
2014	Scouting for Zebras	Yaya Koné	Benoît Mariage	Magritte Award for Most Promising Actor; Nominated - Trophees Francophones du Cinema - Best Supporting Actor
2015	Dheepan	Youssouf	Jacques Audiard	Nominated - Magritte Award for Best Supporting Actor
2015	Spectre	Moreau	Sam Mendes	English language film
2015	The Night Watchman	Ketu	Pierre Jolivet	
2015	Les amoureuses	The man	Catherine Cosme	Short
2015	Peplum	Narcissus	Philippe Lefebvre	TV series (3 episodes)
2016	The Unknown Girl	The pimp	Dardenne brothers	Crime / Drama / Mystery
2016	The African Doctor	Seyolo Zantoko	Julien Rambaldi	Biography / Comedy / Drama
2018	The Mercy of the Jungle	Sergeant Xavier	Joël Karekezi	Nominated - Magritte Award for Best Actor
2019	Young Ahmed	Juge	Dardenne brothers	Drama
2020	Brutus vs César	Claudius	Kheiron	Comedy film
2020	Moloch	Jimmy		TV series (6 episodes)
2022	Tori and Lokita	Firmin	Dardenne brothers	Drama
2022	The Nannies	Gabin	Julien Rambaldi	
2023	Black Box	Thibaut Monier	Aslı Özge	Drama
2023	Omen	Koffi	Baloji	Internationally released as Omen
2024	Citoyens clandestin	Martine		TV Mini Series (4 episodes)
2024	Blood River	Kosa		TV Mini Series (4 episodes)
2024	9.3 BB	Dominique Dealer		TV Mini Series (4 episodes)
2025	Young Mothers	Hairdressing teacher	Dardenne brothers	
2025	A Morra	Marc	Laurenzo Massoni	Short film
2025	Allah n'est pas obligé	Papa Lebon	Zaven Najjar	Voice role
2025	Fils de	Denis Pikelfleisch	Carlos Abascal Peiro	
