= Ari (2025 film) =

2025 film by Léonor Serraille

- Directed by: Léonor Serraille
- Written by: Léonor Serraille
- Produced by: Sandra da Fonseca; Grégoire Debailly
- Starring: Andranic Manet; Pascal Rénéric; Eva Lallier; Ryad Ferrad; Théo Delezenne
- Cinematography: Sébastien Buchmann
- Edited by: Clémence Carré
- Production companies: Geko Films; Blue Monday Productions
- Distributed by: Be For Films
- Release date: February 15, 2025 (Berlinale)
- Running time: 90 minutes
- Countries: France; Belgium
- Language: French

Ari is a 2025 French drama film written and directed by Léonor Serraille. The film starring Andranic Manet as Ari, a young teacher quits his job and when deserted by his father, wandering alone, he reconnects with old friends, starting a journey of self-discovery.

The film was selected in the Competition at the 75th Berlin International Film Festival, where it competed for the Golden Bear and had first screening on 15 February 2025 at Berlinale Palast.

== Synopsis ==
Ari, 27 years-old, passes his teaching exam but suffers a nervous breakdown nine months later while working as a trainee teacher in Lille. Hospitalized and signed off work, he is forced out of his family home by his frustrated father. Disoriented and feverish, Ari wanders the city, experiencing strange visions and unexpected encounters.

== Cast ==
- Andranic Manet as Ari
- Pascal Rénéric as Ari's father
- Eva Lallier as Clara
- Ryad Ferrad as Ryad
- Théo Delezenne as Jonas
- Lomane de Dietrich as Aurore
- Mikaël-Don Giancarli as The Gardener
- Clémence Coullon as Irène

== Release ==
Ari had its world premiere on 15 February 2025, as part of the 75th Berlin International Film Festival, in Competition.

Brussels-based company Be For Films on acquired the sales rights of the film in January 2025.

== Accolades ==
Award	Date of ceremony	Category	Recipient	Result	Ref.
Berlin International Film Festival	23 February 2025	Golden Bear	Ari	Nominated	
