= The Mercy of the Jungle =

2018 film by Joel Karekezi

- Directed by: Joël Karekezi
- Screenplay by: Joël Karekezi; Casey Schroen; Aurélien Bodinaux
- Produced by: Aurélien Bodinaux
- Starring: Marc Zinga; Stéphane Bak; Ibrahim Ahmed "Pino"; Nirere Shanel; Abby Mukiibi Nkaaga; Michael Wawuyo
- Cinematography: Joachim Philippe
- Edited by: Antoine Donnet
- Music by: Line Adam; Nirere Shanel
- Production company: Neon Rouge Productions
- Release date: 8 September 2018 (Toronto)
- Running time: 91 minutes
- Countries: Belgium; France; Rwanda; Germany
- Language: French

The Mercy of the Jungle (French: La Miséricorde de la Jungle) is a 2018 internationally co-produced film from Rwandan director Joël Karekezi, starring Marc Zinga and Stéphane Bak. It tells the story of two Rwandan soldiers separated from their military unit at the beginning of the Second Congo War and their struggle to survive in a hostile jungle environment amidst intense armed conflict.

The film premiered at the Toronto International Film Festival on 8 September 2018, and was screened at several other film festivals.

== Plot ==
War-weary Sergeant Xavier and fresh recruit Private Faustin are accidentally separated from their Rwandan battalion inside Congolese territory when it is called out suddenly on nighttime raid. They face a lack of water, food, and threats from malarial fever and jungle wildlife. The two seek to reunite with the battalion by heading westward but must remain wary of interacting with the local population given Congolese antipathy to the Rwandan Army and the presence of irregular rebel factions.

At first the older Xavier is gruff and demanding toward the young private, Faustin, but a deep bond eventually develops between the two men, especially as Faustin makes critical contributions toward their survival. The film is interspersed with meditations on the horrors that have befallen the region and wider questions of meaning and mercy in times of war. Xavier is particularly haunted by the atrocities he has both witnessed and committed while Faustin is motivated by the murder of his family and a young wife he wishes to see again.

Eventually choosing to impersonate Congolese soldiers themselves, the two manage to fall in with a group of villagers who show them kindness and aid. The movie's various plot threads—pursuing rebels, reunification with the war, and the personal journeys of the two men—converge at the film's conclusion.

== Cast ==
- Marc Zinga as Sergeant Xavier
- Stéphane Bak as Private Faustin
- Nirere Shanel as Amina
- Ibrahim Ahmed as rebel leader Mukundzi
- Kantarama Gahigiri as Kazungu
- Abby Mukiibi Nkaaga as the Major
- Michael Wawuyo as the Village Chief
- Matthew Nabwiso as Paul
- Michael Wawuyo Jr. as Refugee
- Nsereko Mazinga Henry as Prisoner
- Cedrick Mbongo Mbulu as Prisoner
- Joel Okuyo Prynce as Kibindankoyi
- River Dan Rugaju as Captain

== Production ==
The Mercy of the Jungle marks the second feature from Karekezi. The film was produced in Belgium by Aurélien Bodinaux through Neon Rouge Productions. Bodinaux, Karekezi, and Casey Schroen are credited with the screenplay. Tact Productions from France and Perfect Shot Films from Germany are listed as co-producers. Filming took place in Uganda.

== Release ==
The film premiered at the Toronto International Film Festival on 8 September 2018 in the "Discovery" section for new directors of feature films. The film was selected among TIFF's Discovery series lineup.

It was also screened at the Festival International du Film Francophone de Namur in Belgium. On 20 November 2018, it had its Rwandan premiere at the 2018 European Film Festival (EFF) in Kigali. The film won the Golden Stallion at the Panafrican Film and Television Festival of Ouagadougou (FESPACO).

== Accolades ==
Bak was selected as one of eight rising stars at TIFF.

Awards & Nominations
Year	Award	Category	Received by	Result	Ref
2020	Magritte Awards	Best Actor	Marc Zinga	Nominated	
2019	Africa Movie Academy Awards	Best Achievement in Production Design	Genevieve Leyh	Nominated	
2019	Africa Movie Academy Awards	Best Achievement in Make-Up	Shakira Kibirige; Rose Kebirungi; Daphine Kateregga	Won	
2019	Africa Movie Academy Awards	Best Achievement in Soundtrack	Line Adam	Nominated	
2019	Africa Movie Academy Awards	Best Achievement in Editing	Antoine Donnet	Nominated	
2019	Africa Movie Academy Awards	Best Actor in a Leading Role	Marc Zinga	Won	
2019	Africa Movie Academy Awards	Best Costume Design		Won	
2019	Africa Movie Academy Awards	Best Cinematography		Nominated	
2019	Africa Movie Academy Awards	Best Film	Joël Karekezi	Won	
2019	Africa Movie Academy Awards	Best Director	Joël Karekezi	Nominated	
2019	Panafrican Film and Television Festival of Ouagadougou (FESPACO)	Étalon d'or de Yennenga (Golden Stallion)	Joël Karekezi	Won	
2018	Khouribga African Film Festival	Best Screenplay	Joël Karekezi; Casey Schroen; Aurelien Bodinaux	Won	
2018	Khouribga African Film Festival	Best Supporting Actor		Won	
