= Kantarama Gahigiri =

Swiss and Rwandan filmmaker

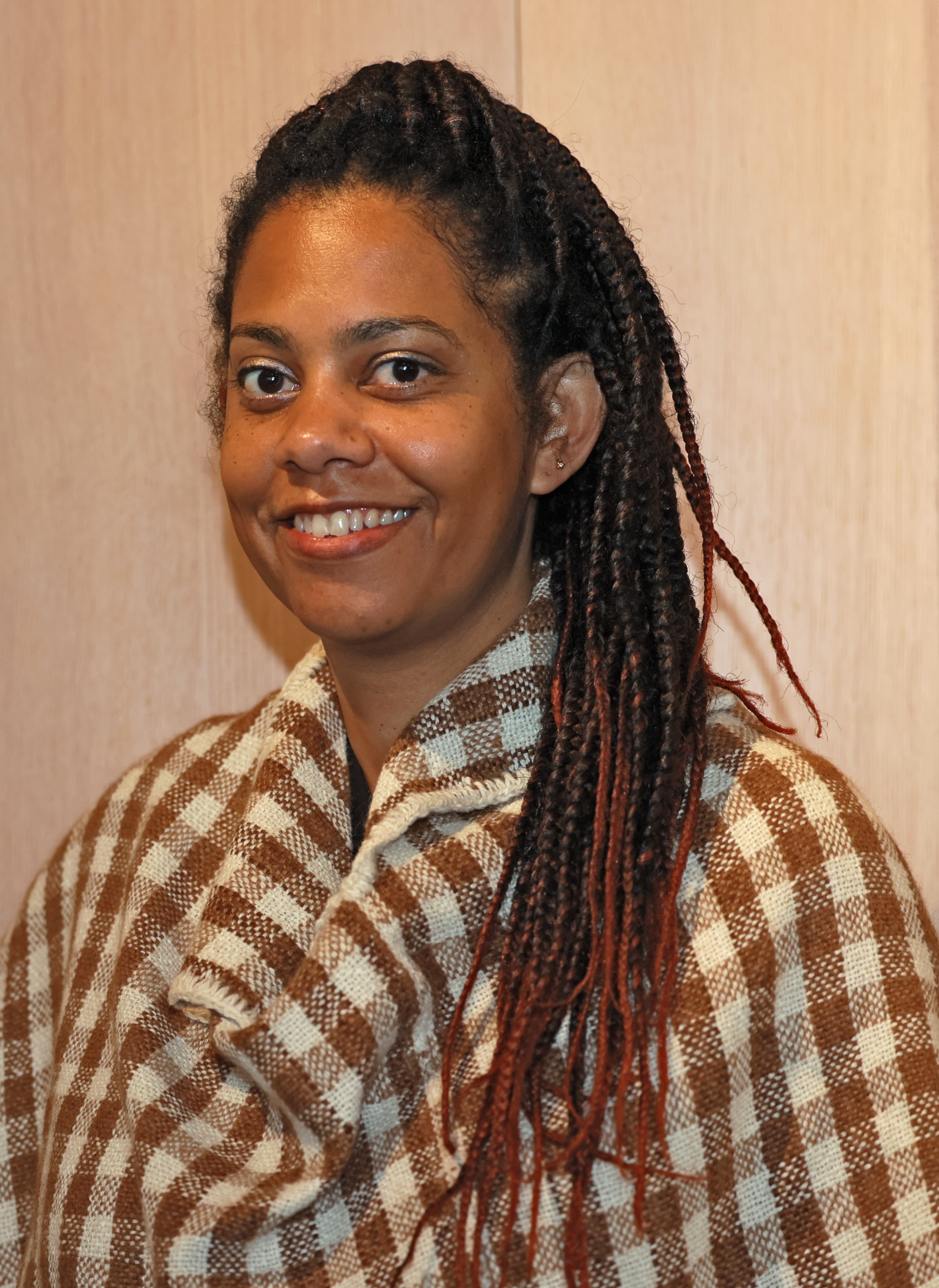
- Born: December 3, 1976 (age 48)
- Occupation(s): Writer, Director and Producer
- Years active: 2008–present

Kantarama Gahigiri (born December 13, 1976) is a Swiss and Rwandan filmmaker. She is best known for her films Tapis rouge, Me + U, Lost Angel Less and more. She holds master's degrees from the Graduate Institute of International and Development Studies and the New York Institute of Technology.

== Career ==
Gahigiri's first feature film Tapis Rouge has been awarded Best Feature Film at Geneva International Film Festival and Best Directing at Chelsea Film Festival. She is now developing Tanzanite, an afro pulp dystopian thriller through Realness - An African Screenwriter's Residency.

== Filmography ==
Short film

Year	Title	Director	Writer	Producer
2017	Né Pour Mourir	Yes	No	No
2017	Lost Angel Less	Yes	Yes	Yes
2014	Pinot in the Grass	Yes	Yes	Yes
2011	The Elevator	Yes	Yes	Yes
2009	Leila	Yes	Yes	Yes
2008	Check	Yes	Yes	Yes

Feature film

Year	Title	Director	Writer	Producer
2014	Tapis rouge	Yes	Yes	Yes

Television

Year	Title	Director	Writer	Producer
2013	Me + U	Yes	Yes	Yes

Acting credits

- The Mercy of the Jungle (2018)
- 2B (2009)

== Awards ==
- Chelsea Film Festival - Best Directing Award 2015
