= Farewell to the Night =

- Theatrical release poster
- French: L'Adieu à la nuit
- Directed by: André Téchiné
- Written by: André Téchiné; Léa Mysius
- Produced by: Olivier Delbosc
- Starring: Catherine Deneuve; Kacey Mottet Klein; Oulaya Amamra
- Cinematography: Julien Hirsch
- Edited by: Albertine Lastera
- Music by: Alexis Rault
- Production companies: Curiosa Films; Bellini Films; Arte France Cinéma; ZDF/Arte; Legato Films; Films Boutique
- Distributed by: Ad Vitam
- Release dates: 12 February 2019 (Berlinale); 24 April 2019 (France)
- Running time: 103 minutes
- Country: France
- Language: French
- Box office: $2.1 million

Farewell to the Night (French: L'Adieu à la nuit) is 2019 French drama thriller film directed by André Téchiné from a screenplay written by Téchiné and Léa Mysius, based on an original idea from Téchiné and Amer Alwan. It stars Catherine Deneuve as a woman who is visited by her beloved grandson as he prepares to leave for a new job in Canada, but she slowly learns about his dark secrets.

== Cast ==
- Catherine Deneuve as Muriel
- Kacey Mottet Klein as Alex
- Oulaya Amamra as Lila
- Stéphane Bak as Bilal
- Mohamed Djouhri as Youssef
- Jacques Nolot as Lila's landlord
- Kamel Labroudi as Fouad

== Production ==
Principal photography took place from 9 April to 7 June 2018. Filming took place entirely in the Pyrénées-Orientales department. Locations included Montesquieu-des-Albères, Perpignan, Villeneuve-de-la-Raho, Cabestany, Port-Vendres, Canet-en-Roussillon, Saint-Cyprien, Argelès-sur-Mer, Céret and Le Boulou.
