= Stop Me Here =

- Theatrical release poster
- Arrêtez-moi là
- Directed by: Gilles Bannier
- Written by: Gilles Bannier; Nathalie Hertzberg
- Based on: The Cab Driver by Iain Levison
- Produced by: Agathe Berman; Anne Derré; Nadia Khamlichi; Adrian Politowski; Gilles Waterkeyn; Clerc Marie-Amelie
- Starring: Reda Kateb; Léa Drucker
- Cinematography: Alain Marcoen
- Edited by: Peggy Koretzky
- Music by: Siegfried Canto; Hervé Salters
- Production company: Legato Films
- Distributed by: EuropaCorp
- Release dates: 29 August 2015 (Angoulême); 6 January 2016
- Running time: 94 minutes
- Language: French
- Budget: $3 million
- Box office: $214,000

Stop Me Here (original title: Arrêtez-moi là) is a 2015 French thriller-drama film directed by Gilles Bannier.

== Plot ==
Samson Cazalet, a taxi driver in the Nice region, is accused of kidnapping the daughter of a client he had collected at the airport.

== Cast ==
- Reda Kateb : Samson Cazalet
- Léa Drucker : Louise Lablache
- Gilles Cohen : Lawyer Portal
- Julia Piaton : The Judge
- Stéphanie Murat : Lawyer Hélène Lafferrière
- Erika Sainte : Elisabeth Ostrovsky
- Philippe Fretun : François Pastor
- Cosme Castro : Herrero
- Themis Pauwels : Mélanie Lablache
- Guillaume Toucas : Archambaud
- Nicole Shirer : Madame Gravate
- Tien Shue : Lu-Pan
- Manon Simier & Amélie Robin : Flavie
- Sandrine Blancke : The Clerk
- Sabina Sciubba : The Singer
