= Another Life (2013 film) =

- Film poster
- French: Une autre vie
- Directed by: Emmanuel Mouret
- Written by: Emmanuel Mouret
- Produced by: Frédéric Niedermayer
- Starring: JoeyStarr; Virginie Ledoyen; Jasmine Trinca
- Cinematography: Laurent Desmet
- Edited by: Martial Salomon
- Music by: Grégoire Hetzel
- Production company: Moby Dick Films
- Distributed by: Pyramide Distribution
- Release dates: 11 August 2013 (Locarno); 22 January 2014 (France)
- Running time: 95 minutes
- Country: France
- Language: French
- Budget: €3.5 million

Another Life (French: Une autre vie), also known as Lovers, is a 2013 French romantic drama film written and directed by Emmanuel Mouret. It stars JoeyStarr, Virginie Ledoyen and Jasmine Trinca.

== Cast ==
- JoeyStarr as Jean
- Virginie Ledoyen as Dolorès
- Jasmine Trinca as Aurore
- Stéphane Freiss as Paul
- Ariane Ascaride as Claudine
- Clément Rousset as Thomas
- Thibault Vinçon as The young composer
- Bernard Verley as The doctor
