= Mother and Son (2022 film) =

Film by Léonor Serraille

- Theatrical release poster
- French: Un petit frère
- Directed by: Léonor Serraille
- Written by: Léonor Serraille
- Produced by: Sandra da Fonseca
- Starring: Annabelle Lengronne; Stéphane Bak; Kenzo Sambin; Ahmed Sylla; Sidy Fofana; Milan Doucansi
- Cinematography: Hélène Louvart
- Edited by: Clémence Carré
- Production companies: Blue Monday Productions; France 3 Cinéma
- Distributed by: Diaphana Distribution; mk2
- Release dates: 27 May 2022 (Cannes); 1 February 2023 (France)
- Running time: 116 minutes
- Country: France
- Language: French

Mother and Son (French: Un petit frère, lit. 'A Little Brother') is a 2022 French drama film written and directed by Léonor Serraille, starring Annabelle Lengronne, Stéphane Bak, Kenzo Sambin, Ahmed Sylla, Sidy Fofana and Milan Doucansi.

== Cast ==
- Annabelle Lengronne as Rose
- Stéphane Bak as young Jean
- Kenzo Sambin as young Ernest
- Ahmed Sylla as Ernest
- Sidy Fofana as little Jean
- Milan Doucansi as little Ernest
- Audrey Kouakou as Eugenie
- Étienne Minoungou
- Thibaut Evrard as Thierry
- Jean-Christophe Folly as Julius Caesar
- Laetitia Dosch

== Release ==
The film premiered at the 75th Cannes Film Festival on 27 May 2022. It was released theatrically in France on 1 February 2023 by Diaphana Distribution. International distribution is handled by MK2 Films.

== Reception ==
Peter Bradshaw of The Guardian rated the film 4 stars out of 5. Diego Semerene of Slant Magazine rated the film 3 stars out of 4 and calling it a "lovely film about feminine strength that also refuses to glorify motherhood." Guy Lodge of Variety wrote, "An unsentimental but stoically anguished portrait of a tough single mother and two vulnerable sons settling (or not) in France from the Ivory Coast, it shows how the immigrant experience can equally tighten the knot between parent and child, or permanently unravel it." Ben Croll of TheWrap wrote that the film "plays on the most intimate of registers" Stephanie Bunbury of Deadline Hollywood wrote a positive review of the film.

Wendy Ide of Screen Daily wrote that "although Mother And Son loses some of its energy as it unfolds, it is still a sensitive and complex examination of the shifting tensions in a migrant family." Lovia Gyarkye of The Hollywood Reporter wrote that the film "contains moving strokes", but "struggles to make a lasting emotional dent." Sophie Monks Kaufman of Little White Lies wrote that the writing "cannot match the poignancy of Lengronne's performance."
