= Dog on Trial =

2024 film by Laetitia Dosch

- Theatrical release poster
- French: Le Procès du chien
- Directed by: Laetitia Dosch
- Written by: Laetitia Dosch; Anne-Sophie Bailly
- Based on: An original idea by Laetitia Dosch
- Produced by: Lionel Baier; Agnieszka Ramu; Thomas Verhaeghe; Mathieu Verhaeghe
- Starring: Laetitia Dosch; François Damiens; Jean-Pascal Zadi; Anne Dorval; Kodi; Mathieu Demy; Anabela Moreira; Pierre Deladonchamps
- Cinematography: Alexis Kavyrchine
- Edited by: Suzana Pedro; Isabelle Devinck
- Music by: David Sztanke
- Production companies: Bande à Part Films; Atelier de Production; RTS Radio Télévision Suisse; SRG SSR; France 2 Cinéma
- Distributed by: Pathé Films AG (Switzerland); The Jokers Films (France)
- Release dates: 19 May 2024 (Cannes); 11 September 2024 (France)
- Running time: 80 minutes
- Countries: Switzerland; France
- Language: French
- Box office: $938,767

Dog on Trial (French: Le Procès du chien), previously known as Who Let the Dog Bite?, is a 2024 comedy film co-written and directed by Laetitia Dosch, in her directorial debut. It stars Dosch as a lawyer who defends a dog on trial. It is loosely based on a real case in France involving a dog that was biting strangers.

It had its world premiere in the Un Certain Regard section at the 77th Cannes Film Festival on 19 May 2024, where lead animal actor Kodi won the Palm Dog Award.

== Premise ==
Avril is an idealistic lawyer with a predilection for hopeless cases. She agrees to defend Dariuch's dog Cosmos, who has bitten three people, leading to the first canine trial since the Middle Ages. She feels pressure to win the case, as otherwise her unusual client will be euthanized.

== Cast ==
- Laetitia Dosch as Avril Lucciani
- François Damiens as Dariuch Michovski
- Jean-Pascal Zadi as Marc
- Anne Dorval as Roseline Bruckenheimer
- Kodi as Cosmos
- Mathieu Demy as The Judge
- Anabela Moreira as Lorene Furtado
- Pierre Deladonchamps as Jérôme
- Tom Fiszelson as Joachim

== Production ==
Dog on Trial is the directorial debut of French actress Laetitia Dosch, who wrote the film's screenplay with Anne-Sophie Bailly. It is loosely based a real-life story of a trial in France which centred on a dog that had repeatedly bitten strangers. Dosch was fascinated by how the case had captivated the entire village where it took place, where demonstrators protested the fact that the dog was treated by the law as an object rather than a living being. In the early stages of the film's development, Dosch briefly considered changing the subject of the film after an encounter with filmmaker Justine Triet, who previously directed Dosch in the film Age of Panic (2013), and revealed to Dosch the premise of her next film Anatomy of a Fall (2023) which similarly centers on a trial, a child, a blind person and a dog.

The film is produced by Lionel Baier and Agnieszka Ramu for Bande à Part Films (Switzerland) and by Thomas and Mathieu Verhaeghe for Atelier de Production (France), in co-production with RTS Radio Télévision Suisse, SRG SSR and France 2 Cinéma. Filming took place entirely in Switzerland, particularly in the canton of Vaud, including Lausanne, Vevey and Gimel.

== Release ==
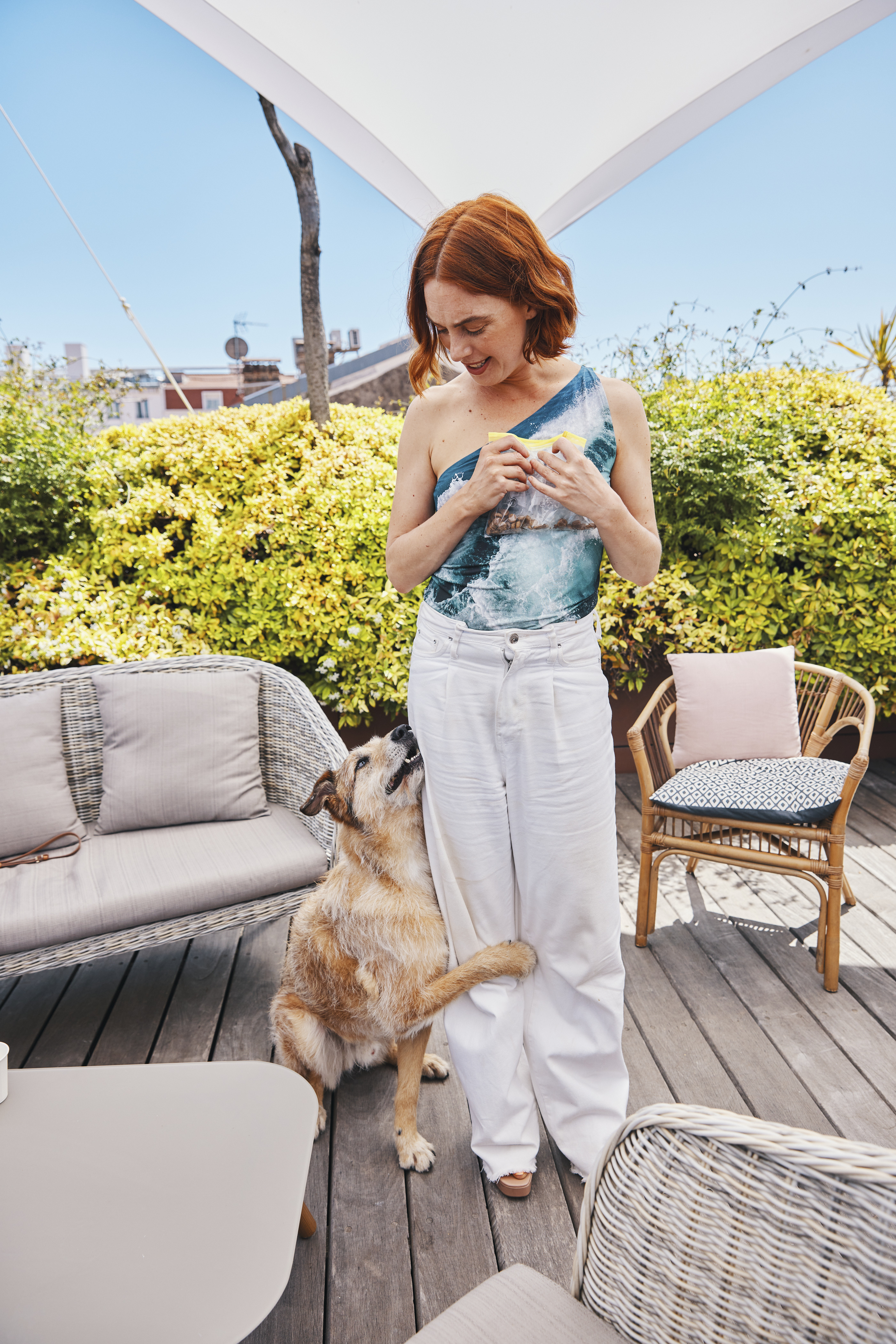
Laetitia Dosch with Kodi at the 2024 Cannes Film Festival

Dog on Trial was selected to compete in the Un Certain Regard section at the 77th Cannes Film Festival, where it had its world premiere on 19 May 2024.

International sales are handled by mk2 Films. The Jokers Films released the film in France on 11 September 2024, while Pathé Films AG released it in Switzerland.

== Reception ==
=== Critical response ===
On AlloCiné, the film received an average rating of 3.3 out of 5 stars, based on 27 reviews from French critics. On the review aggregator website Rotten Tomatoes, 71% of 7 critics' reviews are positive, with an average rating of 7/10.

=== Accolades ===
Award	Date of ceremony	Category	Recipient(s)	Result	Ref.
Cannes Film Festival	25 May 2024 (Note: The Palm Dog Award was presented at a special event on 24 May 2024. The award ceremony of Un Certain Regard was held on 24 May 2024.)	Palm Dog Award	Kodi	Won	
Cannes Film Festival	25 May 2024	Prix Un Certain Regard	Laetitia Dosch	Nominated	
Cannes Film Festival	25 May 2024	Caméra d'Or	Laetitia Dosch	Nominated	
Louis Delluc Prize	4 December 2024	Best First Film	Dog on Trial	Nominated	
