= Roads (film) =

- Film poster
- Directed by: Sebastian Schipper
- Written by: Sebastian Schipper; Oliver Ziegenbalg
- Produced by: David Keitsch
- Starring: Fionn Whitehead; Stéphane Bak; Moritz Bleibtreu
- Cinematography: Matteo Cocco
- Edited by: Monica Coleman
- Production companies: Missing Link Films; Arte; Komplizen Film; HanWay Films; Kazak Productions
- Distributed by: StudioCanal
- Release dates: April 25, 2019 (Tribeca); May 30, 2019 (Germany)
- Running time: 99 minutes
- Countries: Germany; France; United Kingdom
- Language: English

Roads is a 2019 internationally co-produced drama film, directed by Sebastian Schipper, from a screenplay by Schipper and Oliver Ziegenbalg. It stars Fionn Whitehead and Stéphane Bak.

It had its world premiere at the Tribeca Film Festival on 25 April 2019 and was released in Germany on 30 May 2019, by StudioCanal.

== Cast ==
- Fionn Whitehead as Gyllen
- Stéphane Bak as William
- Moritz Bleibtreu as Luttger
- Ben Chaplin as Paul
- Marie Burchard as Valerie
- Paul Brannigan as Alan

== Production ==
In June 2017, it was announced Fionn Whitehead had been cast in the film, with Sebastian Schipper directing from a screenplay he wrote alongside Oliver Ziegenbalg. In August 2017, Stéphane Bak, Moritz Bleibtreu, and Ben Chaplin joined the cast of the film.

Principal photography began in August 2017. During the production stage, the project was named Caravan.

== Release ==
It had its world premiere at the Tribeca Film Festival on 25 April 2019. It was released in Germany on 30 May 2019.
