= Joeystarr =

French rapper, record producer and actor

JoeyStarr
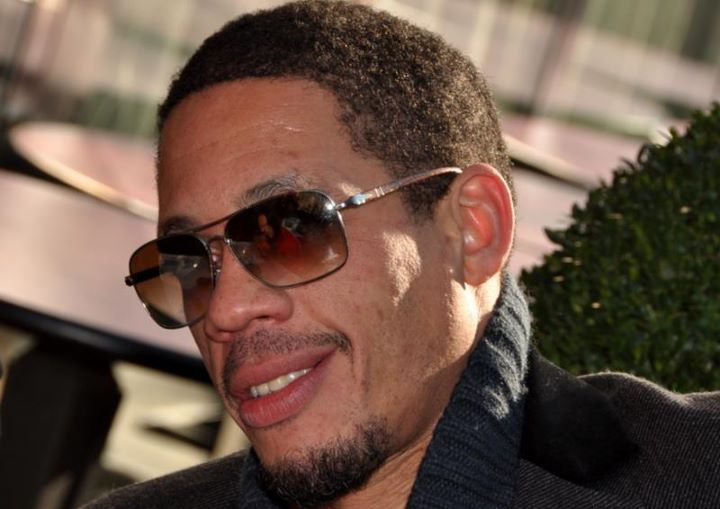
- JoeyStarr at the nominees lunch for the 37th César Awards

Background information
- Also known as: Double R, L'Expert de la maison mère, Jaguarr Gorgone
- Born: Didier Morville; 27 October 1967 (age 58); Saint-Denis, Île-de-France, France
- Genre: Hip hop
- Occupations: Rapper, record producer, actor
- Instruments: Percussion, synthesizer, keyboards, bass guitar, turntables
- Years active: 1989–present
- Labels: Epic, B.O.S.S.
- Website: joeystarr.fr

Didier Morville (French pronunciation: [didje mɔʁvil]; born 27 October 1967), better known by his stage name JoeyStarr, is a French rapper, record producer and actor, from Saint-Denis, Île-de-France. He co-founded the French rap band Suprême NTM in 1989 along with Kool Shen.

== Life and career ==
=== Childhood and upbringing ===
JoeyStarr is from a family originating from the French overseas department of Martinique. He had a difficult childhood, having been raised by his violent father until he turned 18. He was taken from his mother when he was five years old, and only saw her again 18 years later. He tells of a time when his father killed his pet rabbit and made him eat it.

In 1985, he joined the military at Baden-Baden, "19 months of hell", an experience which he raps about in his album Authentik.

After the army, he wandered the streets, sleeping in subways and alleys. He discovered drugs and hip-hop, and the latter changed his life.

=== Suprême NTM ===
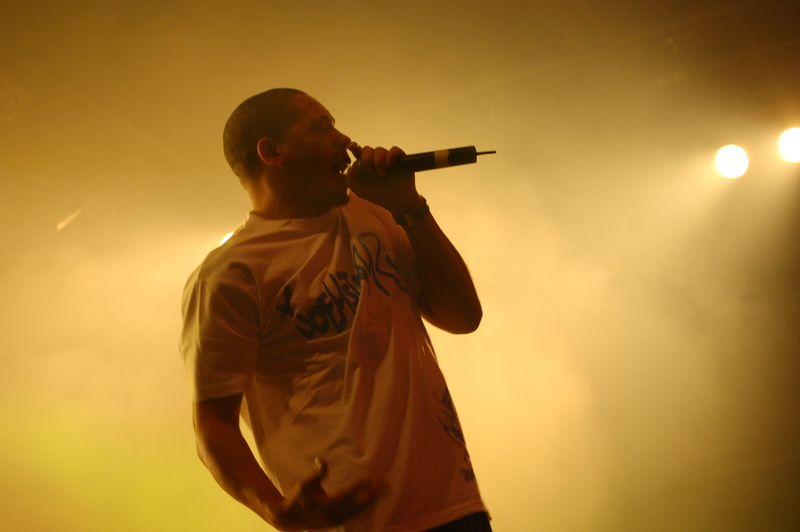
JoeyStarr (2007)

During his time on the streets, he met another aspiring rapper, Kool Shen, who was also born in Saint-Denis. In 1988 they formed the group Suprême NTM alias NTM. When the first single came out in 1989, he could not cash the check, since he could not provide an address or a bank account.

The group achieved record sales with their four albums, but split in 1998.

It had a comeback as announced on 13 March 2008.

== Personal life ==
JoeyStarr met French actress Béatrice Dalle in 1994, and they had a tumultuous relationship for ten years. They separated in 2005, but remained close. In 2026, Dalle said they had not talked for two years.

JoeyStarr has two sons, Mathis and Kalil, with his current girlfriend, hip-hop journalist Leïla Dixmier.

In 1999, he was sentenced to two months in prison for physically harassing a flight attendant. He was also sentenced to three months in prison and fined 2,000 euros for physically abusing a former partner. His criminal record includes 13 infractions. In 2003, he was condemned for animal brutality for hitting a monkey on national television, and was heavily criticized in the press and by his fans.

== Awards and nominations ==
Music

- 2007: "Best rap artist" during L'Année du hip-hop Les trophées
- 2008: "Best concert" during L'Année du hip-hop Les trophées

Acting

- 2010: Nomination for "Best actor in a secondary role" during César Award for his role in Le Bal des actrices
- 2012: Nomination for "Best actor in a secondary role" during César Award for his role in Polisse
- 2012: Laureate for Patrick Dewaere Award

== Discography ==
=== Albums ===
Year	Album	Charts			Certification
Year	Album	BEL Wa	FR	SWI	Certification
2006	La dernière année	20	3	36	
2011	Armageddon (Cut Killer, JoeyStarr & Kimfu)	—	171	—	
2011	Egomaniac	22	5	47	

Mixtapes

- 2006: My Playlist
- 2007: L'Anthology Mixtape

=== Singles ===
Year	Single	Charts	Certification	Album
Year	Single	FR	Certification	Album
2002	"Gaz-L"	29		

== Filmography ==
=== Film ===
Year	Film	Role	Notes
2000	La Tour Montparnasse Infernale	Joël	
2000	Old School	Isaac	
2004	RRRrrrr!!!	Wood Club Tester	
2008	Passe-passe	Max	
2008	La Personne aux deux personnes	Himself	
2009	Le Bal des actrices	Himself	
2010	L'Immortel	Le Pistachier	
2011	Polisse	Fred	Nominated–César Award for Best Supporting Actor
2011	Nuit blanche	Feydek	
2012	L'amour dure trois ans	Jean-Georges	
2012	Les seigneurs	Shaheef Berda	
2012	Max	Toni	
2012	Do Not Disturb	Man in Prison	
2013	The Mark of the Angels – Miserere	Frank	
2013	Une autre vie	Jean	
2014	Colt 45	Milo Cardena	
2015	Les Gorilles	Alfonso	
2017	Alibi.com	MC Stocma	
2021	Cette musique ne joue pour personne	Jésus	

=== Television ===
- 1990 : Le Lyonnais (1 episode "Taggers)
- 2001 : Toc toc toc (TV mini series) as himself
- 2002 : H - (1 episode, "Lucifer")
- 2003 : 60 jours 60 nuits de Juliette Baudouin as himself
- 2008-2010 : Mafiosa, le clan as Moktar
- 2015 : Call My Agent ! as himself
