= Imbabazi: The Pardon =

2013 film

- Film poster
- Directed by: Joël Karekezi
- Written by: Joël Karekezi
- Release date: 28 January 2013 (Göteborg International Film Festival)
- Running time: 77 minutes
- Country: Rwanda
- Language: English

Imbabazi: The Pardon is a 2013 Rwandan film, written and directed by Joël Karekezi in his feature film debut.

Imbabazi: The Pardon was made on a low budget, with actors performing for free, and shot in Uganda. The film grew out of Karekezi's earlier short film, The Pardon (2009), which won the Golden Impala Award at the Amakula Film Festival. It received a development award from Gothenburg Film Festival, where it premiered on 28 January 2013. It was also shown at San Diego Black Film Festival, Pan African Film Festival, Fespaco and Seattle International Film Festival 2013.

== Plot ==
The film follows two former friends, Manzi and Karemera, whose lives diverge during the 1994 Rwandan genocide. Manzi joins Hutu Power, while Karemara's life is in danger as a Tutsi. Fifteen years later Manzi is released from prison and tries to make amends for his violent past.

== Cast ==
- Wilson Egessa as Karemera
- Joel Okuyo Atiku Prynce as Manzi
- Rehema Nanfuka as Alice
- Michael Wawuyo as Kalisa
- Brenda Ibarah as Dusabe
- Dissan Matovu as Eric
- Carlos George as Mayor Bosco
- Simon Kivumbi as Claude Boda
- Kafuruku Peter as Dr. James
- Patrick Mujuka as Psychiatrist
- Richard Wandera as Soldier John
- Keloy Kemigisha as Judith
- Kiconco Allen as Marte
- Okiyet Julius as Marvin

== Awards ==
- Nominee, Best Child Actor, Africa Movie Academy Awards 2013.
- Nominee, Audience Choice Award, Chicago International Film Festival 2013
- Nominee, Political Film Award, Hamburg Film Festival 2013
- Winner, Nile Grand Prize, Luxor African Film Festival 2014
