= The Crimson Rivers (TV series) =

French-language crime thriller television series

- French: Les Rivières pourpres
- Genre: Crime thriller
- Created by: Jean-Christophe Grangé
- Based on: Les Rivières pourpres by Jean-Christophe Grangé
- Directed by: Ivan Fegyveres; Olivier Barma; Julius Berg
- Starring: Olivier Marchal; Erika Sainte
- Composer: David Reyes
- Countries of origin: France; Belgium; Germany
- Original language: French
- No. of seasons: 4
- No. of episodes: 32

Production
- Executive producer: Thomas Anargyros
- Producers: Sabine Barthélémy; Bastien Sirodot; Nadia Khamlichi; Adrian Politowski
- Editors: Jean-Daniel Fernandez-Qundez; Ain Varet; Joël Jacovella
- Running time: 45-49 minutes (French); 90 minutes (German)
- Production companies: Storia Télévision; Maze Pictures

Original release
- Network: RTS 1
- Release: 6 September 2018
- Network: ZDF
- Release: 5 November 2018
- Network: France 2
- Release: 26 November 2018 – 10 October 2022

The Crimson Rivers (French: Les Rivières pourpres) is a French-language crime thriller television series created by Jean-Christophe Grangé and follows Grangé's 1998 novel Blood Red Rivers and its 2000 film adaptation. It has been broadcast in Romandy since 6 September 2018 on RTS 1, in Belgium and France, from 26 November 2018 to 10 October 2022 on France 2, and in Germany since 5 November 2018 on ZDF.

== Synopsis ==
Following the events in Guernon, Commissioner Pierre Niemans (Olivier Marchal) is transferred to head the Central Office Against Crimes of Blood (OCCS). He teams up with a former and best student Camille Delaunay (Erika Sainte). The commissioner regards her as his daughter. Together they will crack the most difficult cases.

== Cast ==
=== Main ===
- Olivier Marchal: Commissioner Pierre Niemans (seasons 1–4), a legend of the French police, despite certain tensions with his hierarchy and his sometimes dubious respect for protocol. Without a wife or a child, Niemans gives body and soul to his investigations and never gives up, always pushing his own limits. But beneath his rigid cop looks hides a generous, deeply good man who has spent his life tracking down the evil side of man.
- Erika Sainte: Lieutenant Camille Delaunay (seasons 1–4), is Niemans' female counterpart, who is a lieutenant and his best student at the police academy and treats her as the daughter he never had, and she crosses paths with him during investigations that seals into an elite tandem. Beneath her energetic traits, she is meticulous and fierce. Her love and admiration for Niemans make her a staunch ally, who doesn't hesitate to risk her life for the one who taught her everything.

=== Recurring and guest ===
==== Season 1 ====
- Ken Duken: Nikolas Kleinert
- Patrick Descamps: Philipp Schüller
- Idwig Stephane: Frantz von Geyersberg
- Michelangelo Marchese: Karl Bruch
- Jean-Michel Vovk: Wunderlich
- Daniel Njo Lobé: Thierry Chauveron
- Vincent Londez: Lieutenant Colonel Kirsh
- Thierry Janssen: Joseph Raynaud
- Stéphan Wojtowicz: Eric Castinet
- Patrick Ridremont: Beaucarne
- Philippe Résimont: Archpriest Rector Koynski
- Jo Prestia: Mathussenne
- John Dobrynine: Marc Meyer
- Christopher Lambert: Criminal identification technician
- Françoise Oriane: Nun
- Pierre Laplace: Mariotte
- Jean-Luc Couchard: Nicolas Durero
- Karim Barras: Michel Lagorce
- Fabrice Adde: Cemetery keeper
- Philippe Grand'Henry: Monsieur Gastaigne
- Jean-Michel Balthazar: Monsieur Coudray
- Adeline Dieudonné: Doctor
- Lubna Azabal: Sabrina Harel
- François Levantal: Anselme
- Patrick Catalifo: Medical examiner
- Steve Driesen: Philippe Gaillard
- Stéphane Bissot: Mayor's wife
- Alain Leempoel: Mayor
- Laurent Van Wetter: Gendarme
- Nora von Waldstätten: Laura von Geyesberg
- Julien Jakout: Laura Von Geyesberg's Butler

==== Season 2 ====
- Gérald Laroche: Charlier
- Claude Perron: Caroline de Montferville
- Christiane Paul: Madame Vialle
- Isabelle de Hertogh: Marie-Pierre
- Élodie Hesme: Moreno
- Isaka Sawadogo: Teacher
- Georges Siatidis: Prosecutor
- Isil Bengi: Diwan
- Pierre Gommé: Yannis
- Jean-Mathias Pondant: Nicolaou
- Audran Cattin: Herminien/Leo

==== Season 3 ====
- Bastien Bouillon: Werner/Jules Malarte
- Jeanne Rosa: Captain Lebel
- Florence Müller: Nanou
- Patrick Catalifo: Canto
- Thomas Durand: Eric Annequin
- François Creton: Jean-Pierre Levant
- Maxime Bailleul: Jérôme Savarolle
- Lizzie Brocheré: Audrey
- Victor Polster: Claude
- Ken Duken: Kleinert
- Philippe Duclos: Director Levrard
- Arben Bajraktaraj: Marek Voisnic
- Natalia Dontcheva: Vera Leroy
- Stephan Wojtowicz: Franck Dumont
- Doudou Masta: Aydin "the Sun King"

==== Season 4 ====
- Baptiste Sornin: Michaël
- Hubert Delattre: Eric
- Benjamin Georjon: Christian
- Diane Dassigny: Emma
- Francesco Mormino: Jacques
- Cathy Grosjean: Nathalie
- Anaël Snoek: Doctor Klein
- Olivia Carrère: Elise
- Luc Brumagne: The Grocer
- Hassiba Halabi: Martine
- Serge Swysen: Mr. Doucet
- Colette Sodoyez: Mrs. Doucet
- Jacky Druaux: Mr. Garal
- Caroline Bouchoms: Charline
- Martin Verset: Colin (10 years old)
- Emile Altenloh: Lucas
- Brigitte Louveaux: Villager
- Jean-Philippe Lejeune: Priest
- Julie Maes: Journalist
- Cyrielle Debreuil: Ariane
- Claude Musungayi: Becker
- Grégoire Oestermann: Josserand
- Jérémy Gillet: Mathias
- Ayumi Roux: Zoé
- Marc Nasrallah: Alban
- Melvine Batakafua: Paul
- Esther Aflalo: Head Nurse
- Alice D'Hauwe: Saleswoman
- Jean-Paul Landresse: Retired Salesman
- Kamel Isker: Patrick Dauphin
- Nadia Kaci: Sauvaire
- Nicolas Cazalé: Cernac
- Arthur Igual: Giacomo
- Francis Renaud: Nicolas Leroy
- Charley Fouquet: Sylvie Guérin
- Heza Botto: Malglaive
- Julie Moulier: Raph
- Mathieu Perotto: Gourmelin
- Frédéric Kneip: Doctor Herbin
- Arthur Rosas: Boissière
- Sandy Afiuni: Chloé Destienne
- Benjamin Jaouen: Captain Tesson
- Thierry Levaret: Fresnay
- Moussa Maaskri: Montfort
- Marie Kauffmann: Chloé
- Sigrid Bouaziz: Eva
- Jean-Michel Lahmi: Sylvain Maune
- Louis-Do de Lencquesaing: Vincent Guerin
- Jean-Louis Loca: Nicolas Merck
- Elise Del Aneho: Maud Zeme
- Florence Thomassin: Nicole
- Christine Urspruch: Dominik
- Grégoire Mesplomb: Martin
- Michaël Assié: Mathieu Malvel
- Sophie Kang: Physiotherapist
- Gwendal Le Bouedec: Young Man 1
- Olivier Lanchy: Young Man 2
- Jeff Bigot: Constable 1
- Yadicone Bassene: PTS Technician and Forensic Scientist
- Julien Ellenrieder: Commissioner Henri Varène
- Edwin Gillet: Beaten Accompanying Officer

== Production ==
=== Development ===
In December 2015, it was announced the adaptation of the novel Blood Red Rivers by Jean-Christophe Grangé as a television series screened by EuropaCorp with the German production company Maze Pictures as its co-producer.

=== Casting ===
In July 2017, Olivier Marchal was chosen to play the character of commissioner Pierre Niemans. Grangé originally wanted Jean Reno in the series, but "everyone considered that he was too old for the role" as he explained in an interview, in November 2018.

The actress Erika Sainte is chosen by the author for the role of Lieutenant Camille Delaunay, after spotting her in the series Baron Noir.

=== Filming locations ===
==== Season 1 ====
Filming began in November 2017 in Namur Province, Walloon Brabant and in Brussels, Belgium. The religious site visible in many scenes is the former Abbey of Marche-les-Dames.

"The Day of the Ashes" were partially filmed in the city of Tournai (in particular on the forecourt of the cathedral) and in Hainaut. The Liège-Guillemins railway station appears at the start of the episode. The chapel is the hermitage and chapel of Saint-Thibaut, located in Marcourt, in the province of Luxembourg.

"The Children's Crusade" was shot partly in the Charleroi region. The Collège du Christ-Roi in Ottignies serves as the backdrop for the Saint Vincent Institute.

The Province of Namur serves as the backdrop for "The Last Hunt": the Château Bayard (in Éghezée) as well as a modernist villa from 1927, in a 4 hectares (430,000 ft^{2}) wooded park in Blaimont (in Hastière), located a few kilometres from the French border and Dinant.

In "Songs of Darkness", some scenes were shot at the hotel "Les trois 3 clés" in Gembloux. The CBR building in Watermael-Boitsfort, a building by Belgian architect Constantin Brodzki, inaugurated in the early 1970s, was selected for the scenes of the police station.

==== Season 2 ====
The shooting of "Holy Theft" took place in Haute-Savoie, partly at the Château of Avenières in Cruseilles, as well as in Sainte-Croix-en-Jarez and in the woods of Vézelin-sur-Loire, in Loire.

==== Season 3 ====
The shooting of "Lune noire" took place in Picardy, partly in Ault-Onival, its cliffs, the esplanade under the storm, and the former Derloche-Cantevelle locksmith factory which transformed into a gendarmerie, and mainly in Hesdin – Pas-de-Calais in the villa Debruyne, also called “Château Dalle”, bequeathed in 2016 with its 7,000 square metres (75,000 ft^{2}) park to the town of Hesdin.

For "XXY", the shooting took place in Vresse-sur-Semois, Belgium, in August 2020.

==== Season 4 ====
Filming of the first two episodes of Kovenkore began on February 16, 2022, for a duration of 45 days in Belgium in the Province of Namur, notably in Viroinval, at the Olloy-sur-Viroin cemetery.

Filming of the next two episodes took place from April 25, 2022 to May 26, 2022 in Aquitaine, particularly around the Arcachon Bay.

Filming of the fifth and sixth episodes took place from May 30, 2022 to June 28, 2022 in Gironde, notably in Bordeaux.

== Episode list ==
English episode titles of Seasons 1 and 2 come from the on-demand services All 4 and SBS On Demand.

=== Season 1 ===
1. "The Last Hunt Part 1" (French: "La Dernière Chasse, 1^{re} partie")
2. "The Last Hunt Part 2" (French: "La Dernière Chasse, 2e partie")
3. "The Day of the Ashes Part 1" (French: "Le Jour des cendres, 1^{re} partie")
4. "The Day of the Ashes Part 2" (French: "Le Jour des cendres, 2^{e} partie")
5. "The Children's Crusade Part 1" (French: "La Croisade des enfants, 1^{re} partie")
6. "The Children's Crusade Part 2" (French: "La Croisade des enfants, 2^{e} partie")
7. "Songs of Darkness Part 1" (UK)/"Lessons of Darkness Part 1" (Australia) (French: "Leçons de ténèbres, 1^{re} partie")
8. "Songs of Darkness Part 2" (UK)/"Lessons of Darkness Part 2" (Australia) (French: "Leçons de ténèbres, 2^{e} partie")

=== Season 2 ===
A second season was announced on 17 December 2018. It is broadcast over four evenings, in January 2020.

1. "Holy Theft Part 1" (UK)/"Furta Sacra Part 1" (Australia) (French: "Furta sacra, 1^{re} partie")
2. "Holy Theft Part 2" (UK)/"Furta Sacra Part 2" (Australia) (French: "Furta sacra, 2^{e} partie")
3. "Kenbaltyu Part 1" (French: "Kenbaltyu, 1^{re} partie")
4. "Kenbaltyu Part 2" (French: "Kenbaltyu, 2^{e} partie")
5. "The Glass Lineage Part 1" (UK)/"Glass Bloodline Part 1" (Australia) (French: "La Lignée de verre, 1^{re} partie")
6. "The Glass Lineage Part 2" (UK)/"Glass Bloodline Part 2" (Australia) (French: "La Lignée de verre, 2^{e} partie")
7. "The Innocents Part 1" (French: "Innocentes, 1^{re} partie")
8. "The Innocents Part 2" (French: "Innocentes, 2^{e} partie")

=== Season 3 ===
1. "Lune noire, 1^{re} partie"
2. "Lune noire, 2^{e} partie"
3. "Rédemption, 1^{re} partie"
4. "Rédemption, 2^{e} partie"
5. "XXY, 1^{re} partie"
6. "XXY, 2^{e} partie"
7. "Jugement dernier, 1^{re} partie"
8. "Jugement dernier, 2^{e} partie"

=== Season 4 ===
1. "Kovenkore, 1^{re} partie"
2. "Kovenkore, 2^{re} partie"
3. "Anima obscura, 1^{re} partie"
4. "Anima obscura, 2^{re} partie"
5. "La dernière vague, 1^{re} partie"
6. "La dernière vague, 2^{re} partie"
7. "La scène, 1^{re} partie"
8. "La scène, 2^{re} partie"

== International broadcasts ==
In the United Kingdom, it aired on More4 on 11 January 2019 as part of Walter Presents. The second season aired on 20 August 2021.

In Australia, it was released on SBS' on-demand service SBS On Demand on the 26 December 2019; it aired on the main channel on 14 April 2021. Season 2 was released in March 2020 in the streaming service; and later aired on television on 6 December of the following year in SBS.

== Awards and nominations ==
=== Awards ===
- Polar Festival of Cognac 2019: French-language Television Film Grand Prize for "Kenbaltyu" (Season 2, Episodes 11 and 12 by David Morley).
- 2020 UCMF Award for Best Fiction TV Music for composer David Reyes, for his work on Season 2.

=== Nominations ===
- La Rochelle TV Fiction Festival 2018: Presentation of "The Day of the Ashes"
- Nominated at the MASA Awards 2019: Best Main Title Music for a Television Series (David Reyes).

== References and notes ==
=== Notes ===
1. Guernon is a fictional town in the Alps created for the novel Blood Red Rivers. It is also present in the film adaptation.

== See also ==
- Blood Red Rivers, 1998 novel by Jean-Christophe Grangé
- The Crimson Rivers, 2000 film directed by Mathieu Kassovitz and starring Jean Reno and Vincent Cassel
- Crimson Rivers II: Angels of the Apocalypse, 2004 sequel directed by Olivier Dahan and starring Reno and Benoît Magimel
