= Laetitia Dosch =

French actress (born 1980)

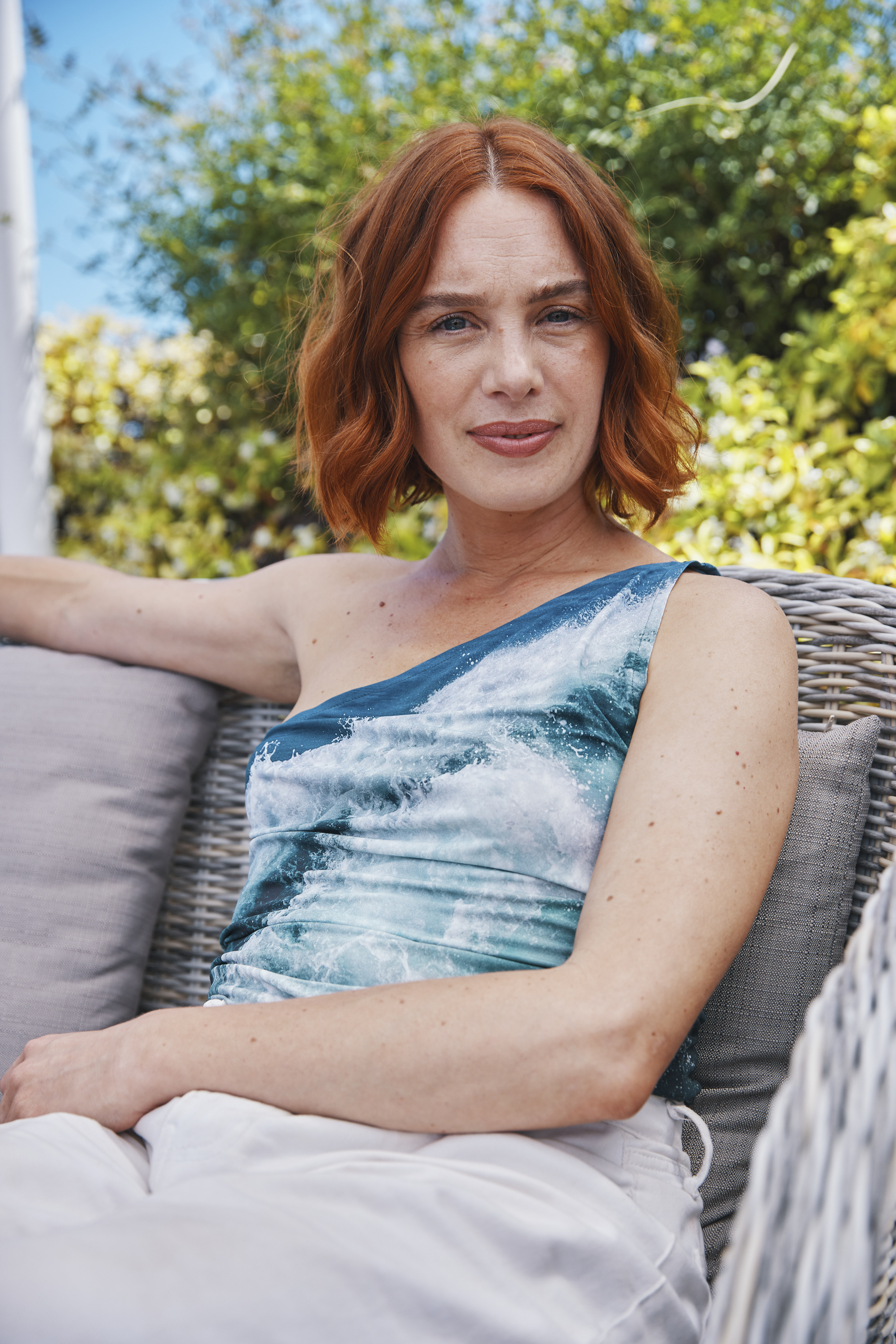
- Dosch at the 2024 Cannes Film Festival
- Born: 1 September 1980 (age 45); Paris, France
- Occupation: Actress
- Years active: 2009–present

Laetitia Dosch (French: [lɛtisja dɔʃ]; born 1 September 1980) is a French-Swiss actress. Her film credits include Age of Panic, Keeper, Summertime, Montparnasse Bienvenue, and Our Struggles. In 2024, she made her directorial debut with Dog on Trial.

== Education ==
Dosch first studied acting at the École d'art dramatique Jean-Périmony in Paris, then entered the free classes at the Cours Florent under the tutelage of Michel Fau and Jean-Michel Rabeux, then moved on to La Manufacture in Lausanne, Switzerland.

== Career ==
Dosch's directorial debut, Dog on Trial, premiered in the Un Certain Regard section of the 2024 Cannes Film Festival, where it was eligible for the Camera d'Or.

== Filmography ==
=== Film ===
Year	Title	Role	Notes
2009	Accomplices	Vincent's sister	—N/a
2013	Age of Panic	Laetitia	—N/a
2015	Mon Roi	Lila	—N/a
2015	Keeper	Mélanie's mother	—N/a
2015	Summertime	Adeline	—N/a
2016	Sophie's Misfortunes	Noémie	—N/a
2016	4 Days in France	The thief	—N/a
2016	La Fine Équipe	Fred	—N/a
2017	Montparnasse Bienvenue	Paula Simonian	—N/a
2017	Gaspard at the Wedding	Laura	—N/a
2018	Our Struggles	Betty	—N/a
2018	Two Plains & a Fancy	Ozanne Le Perrier	—N/a
2019	Of Love and Lies	Sarah	—N/a
2020	Appearances	Tina Brunner	—N/a
2020	Simple Passion	Hélène	—N/a
2021	Playlist	Julia	—N/a
2021	A Change of Heart	Ingrid	—N/a
2021	A Little Lesson of Love	Julie	—N/a
2022	Employee of the Month	Eva Brébant	—N/a
2022	En même temps	Sylvie	—N/a
2022	Mother and Son	Anna	—N/a
2022	Libre Garance!	Michelle	—N/a
2022	The Takeover	Julie	—N/a
2023	Acid	Elise	—N/a
2023	Les Rois de la piste		—N/a
2024	Dog on Trial	Avril Lucciani	Also director and screenwriter
2024	Jim's Story	Florence Pelletier	—N/a
2024	Savages	Jeanne	Voice role

=== Television ===
Year	Title	Role	Notes
2014	Ainsi soient-ils	Daphné	3 episodes
2014	La collection: Ecrire pour... la trentaine vue par des écrivains	Carla	Miniseries; episode: "Le plus petit appartement de Paris"

== Awards and nominations ==
Year	Award	Category	Nominated work	Result	Ref.
2018	César Award	Best Female Newcomer	Montparnasse Bienvenue	Nominated	
2018	Lumière Awards	Best Female Revelation	Montparnasse Bienvenue	Won	
2024	Cannes Film Festival	Un Certain Regard	Dog on Trial	Nominated	
2024	Cannes Film Festival	Camera d'Or	Dog on Trial	Nominated	

== Honours ==
- 2018: Chevalier of the Ordre des Arts et des Lettres
