= The Crimson Rivers =

- Theatrical release poster
- French: Les Rivières pourpres
- Directed by: Mathieu Kassovitz
- Written by: Jean-Christophe Grangé; Mathieu Kassovitz
- Based on: Les Rivières pourpres by Jean-Christophe Grangé
- Produced by: Alain Goldman
- Starring: Jean Reno; Vincent Cassel
- Cinematography: Thierry Arbogast
- Edited by: Maryline Monthieux
- Music by: Bruno Coulais
- Production companies: Gaumont; Légende Entreprises; TF1 Films Production; Canal+
- Distributed by: Gaumont Buena Vista International
- Release date: 27 September 2000
- Running time: 106 minutes
- Country: France
- Language: French
- Budget: €14.4 million; (US$25 million)
- Box office: $60 million

The Crimson Rivers (French: Les Rivières pourpres) is a 2000 French psychological thriller film starring Jean Reno and Vincent Cassel. The film, which was directed by Mathieu Kassovitz, is based on the novel Blood Red Rivers by Jean-Christophe Grangé. The screenplay was written by Grangé and Mathieu Kassovitz.

The film is about two detectives who investigate a series of grisly murders in and around an isolated university campus in a deep valley of the French Alps. With a $25 million budget, the movie went on to gross $60 million from a worldwide theatrical release. Despite its box office success, one of its stars, Vincent Cassel, admitted, "I can't help explain the film because I didn't understand it! We cut out everything in the film that was explanatory, therefore 'boring' [according to the director]. You end up with a film that's not boring but you don't understand it [at] all".

A sequel, Crimson Rivers II: Angels of the Apocalypse (Les Rivières pourpres II: Les Anges de l'apocalypse), was released in 2004 and a tv series sequel, titled The Crimson Rivers, aired in 2018.

== Plot ==
Detective Superintendent (Commissaire Principal) Pierre Niemans is sent to the small university town of Guernon in the French Alps to investigate a brutal murder. Niemans learns that the victim was a professor and the university's librarian, Remy Callois, and he seeks out a local ophthalmologist for an explanation regarding the removal of the victim’s eyes. Dr. Cherneze explains that the school's isolation led to inbreeding amongst the professors, with increasingly serious genetic disorders. Recently the trend has reversed, with the local village children becoming ill and the college babies remaining healthy, something that the local villagers blame on the faculty members.

Coincidentally Detective Inspector (Lieutenant de Police) Max Kerkerian is in the nearby town of Sarzac investigating the desecration of the grave of Judith Herault, a girl who died in 1982, and the theft of her photos from the local primary school. The mother tells Kerkerian that at the faculty's hospital in Guernon, they were attacked by "demons" on their way back and when they fled, her husband and her daughter were killed in the road accident.

Niemans questions Fanny Ferreira, a glaciologist. Niemans breaks into the dead librarian's office and finds details on the faculty history. He discovers that the original faculty-staff were intellectuals who believed in creating a super-race based not on physical criteria but on intellectuality, and that was the real reason for their original inbreeding problems. Soon after, Fanny and Niemans discover a second body, murdered in the same ritualistic fashion inside a glacier.

Niemans meets Kerkerian at the victim’s home, as the latter thinks he violated the grave. Due to the body being endorned with glass eyes, Niemans returns back to Cherneze's practice. The doctor is already dead, and they almost catch the killer, who fights off Niemans and races away. They learn the prints on Niemans's gun belong to Judith Herault. Kerkerian goes back to search the grave in Sarzac, which is empty except for a picture. He returns with the photo from the grave and Niemans recognizes as Fanny.

On the way to her house, they narrowly avoid being run off the road by the Dean's son as they piece together the story: Due to the poor bloodlines and genetic mutations in the faculty's inbred offspring, the doctors at the hospital had been swapping healthy village children with the university children and Callois arranged the matches between both types of children in the college's breeding-program. Sertys, they deduce, must have swapped Fanny for one of the dead faculty babies while leaving her identical twin, Judith, with her birth family as a control subject. When Judith was brought to the hospital because of a broken wrist, her mother saw pictures of Fanny and realized that she was her stolen daughter. The family fled the hospital and were pursued by members of the faculty who caused the accident that killed the husband. The mother hid Judith and faked her death. As the mother slowly descended into madness and took refuge as a nun, Judith sought Fanny, who continued hiding her.

Once at Fanny's house they find the missing hands and eyes of the victims in her basement. Niemans gives the order to evacuate the university while he and Kerkerian travel up the mountain to find Fanny. The duo confront Fanny only to be set upon by Judith. She tells Fanny to kill Niemans and the ensuing gunfight triggers an avalanche. Judith is killed and the rest are buried in the snow until a rescue team arrives.

== Cast ==
Actor/Actress	Role
Jean Reno	Pierre Niemans
Vincent Cassel	Max Kerkerian
Nadia Farès	Fanny Ferreira / Judith Hérault
Dominique Sanda	Sister Andrée
Karim Belkhadra	Captain Dahmane
Jean-Pierre Cassel	Dr. Bernard Chernezé
Didier Flamand	The Dean
Laurent Lafitte	Hubert
François Levantal	Pathologist
Francine Bergé	Headmistress
Philippe Nahon	Man at Petrol Station

== Production ==
Making of video

Exteriors were shot on location near Grenoble in the communes of Albertville, Livet-et-Gavet, Avrieux, Apprieu, Bourg d'Oisans, Vallorcine, Vinay and Virieu sur Bourbre.

The university was actually the Onera Modane-Avrieux wind tunnels Centre at Villarodin-Bourget, Savoy. The glacier scenes were filmed on the Mer de Glace beneath Mont-Blanc and above Argentière in the Chamonix Valley, Haute-Savoie.

== Reception ==
The Crimson Rivers holds a 68% approval rating on Rotten Tomatoes, based on 53 reviews. Metacritic, which uses a weighted average, assigned the film a score of 49 out of 100, based on 19 critics, indicating "mixed or average" reviews. It was nominated for five César Awards: Best Director, Best Cinematography, Best Music, Best Editing, and Best Sound.

The film opened on 548 screens in France and became the number one film, grossing $10 million in its first two weeks from 1.7 million admissions. It went on to gross an estimated $16 million in France and $60 million worldwide.
