= Erika Sainte =

Belgian actress (born 1981)

- Born: 14 July 1981 (age 44)
- Occupation: Actress
- Known for: She is Not Crying, She is Singing; Montparnasse Bienvenue

Erika Sainte (born 14 July 1981) is a Belgian actress. In 2012, she won the Magritte Award for Most Promising Actress for her role in She is Not Crying, She is Singing.

== Biography ==
In 2000, Erika Sainte graduated from the academy of Ixelles, Artistic Humanities Section. She then studied dramatic art at the Institut des arts de diffusion in Louvain-la-Neuve. In 2004, she graduated from the institute.

== Filmography ==
=== Acting ===
==== Feature films ====
- 2011: She is Not Crying, She is Singing: Laura
- 2011: A Happy Event: Television presenter
- 2014: Belgian Rhapsody: Sandrine
- 2014: Belgian Disaster: Magali
- 2014: You're Ugly Too: Émilie
- 2014: The Connection: Olivia
- 2014: All Cats Are Grey
- 2016: Stop Me Here: Zoé Vronski: Elisabeth Ostrovsky
- 2016: Moonwalkers: Ella
- 2016: Les Survivants: Nadia
- 2017: Thousand Cuts: Stéphanie
- 2017: Je suis resté dans les bois: Erika
- 2017: Montparnasse Bienvenue: Lila's mother
- 2017: À deux heures de Paris: Sidonie
- 2018: The Benefit of the Doubt
- 2018: Sink or Swim: Diane
- 2020: Rogue City: Zoé Vronski
- 2020: Louloute: Louloute (adult)

==== Short films ====
- 2004: Né un 14 février
- 2007: Noël 347: Miss Noël
- 2008: Eau de vie
- 2009: Passagers: Erica
- 2011: Marie et Fred (advertisement): Marie
- 2011: Fred et Marie (advertisement): Marie
- 2011: Dos au mur: Natacha
- 2014: Une séparation: Leila

==== Television films ====
- 2002: Passage du bac: Madame Dercourt
- 2018: Jacqueline Sauvage: C'était lui ou moi: Carole
- 2018: Victor Hugo, ennemi d’État: Léonie d'Aunet

==== Television series ====
- 2011: Interpol: Julia Neuvens ("La vie devant soi")
- 2014-2016: Euh: Sylvie (web series)
- 2016-2018: Baron Noir: Fanny
- Since 2018: The Crimson Rivers: Lieutenant Camille Delaunay
- 2021: Mon ange' (miniseries): Nadine Bastien
- 2021: I Killed My Husband: Anna

=== Directing ===
==== Feature films ====
- 2017: Je suis resté dans les bois (co-directed with Michaël Bier and Vincent Solheid)

== Theatre performances ==
- 2005: Vincent in Brixton at Rideau de Bruxelles
- 2005: La Mastication des morts at Rideau de Bruxelles
- 2005: Terre des Folles at the Zone Urbaine Théâtre
- 2005: Uncle Vanya at Théâtre de la Vie
- 2014: Who’s Afraid of Virginia Woolf? at Théâtre Le Public in Brussels

== Awards and nominations ==
Year	Association	Category	Nominee(s)	Result
2012	Magritte Awards	Most Promising Actress	She is Not Crying, She is Singing	Won
