= The Stone Council =

- Theatrical release poster
- French: Le Concile de pierre
- Directed by: Guillaume Nicloux
- Written by: Guillaume Nicloux; Stéphane Cabel
- Produced by: Yves Marmion
- Starring: Monica Bellucci; Catherine Deneuve; Elsa Zylberstein; Moritz Bleibtreu; Lorenzo Balducci
- Cinematography: Peter Suschitzky
- Edited by: Guy Lecorne
- Music by: Éric Demarsan
- Distributed by: UGC
- Release date: 16 November 2006
- Running time: 102 minutes
- Country: France
- Language: French
- Budget: €20 million; (US$28 million)
- Box office: $2.5 million

The Stone Council (French: Le Concile de pierre) is a 2006 French thriller film. Based on a novel by Jean-Christophe Grangé the film depicts an inter-continental, mystical conspiracy unfolding following the adoption of a boy from Mongolia.

== Plot ==
Bellucci plays Diane Siprien, a translator, who adopts a Mongolian child name Liu-San with the help of her friend Sybille. Years later, a bruise appears on the boy's chest, and the two women suffer nightmares. Diane is dispatched on assignment, and Liu goes comatose while in Sybille's temporary care. He begins speaking in an unknown tongue. As Diane tries to place the language, mysterious murders began occurring in her orbit. She discovers the boy comes from an ancient, mystic Mongolian tribe — the Tseven — who want the boy returned to them for a religious prophecy involving the Council of the Stone.

== Reception ==
Variety called the film a "French Sixth Sense", and a "generously budgeted piece of esoterica" that "won't be enough to scare up an audience, unless it's a very young one that hasn't heard all these cliches before." Screen Daily similarly found an American parallel, the Da Vinci Code, and called the film "overwrought".
