= Jean-Christophe Grangé =

French writer, journalist, and screenwriter

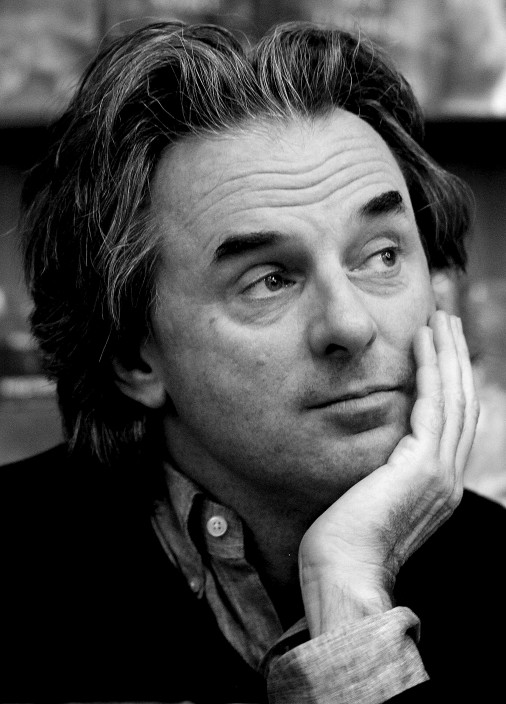
Jean-Christophe Grangé

Jean-Christophe Grangé (born 15 July 1961) is a French mystery writer, journalist, and screenwriter.

Grangé was born in Paris. He was a journalist before setting up his own press agency L & G.

In 1994 he published his first mystery novel "The flight of the storks". His second book "Blood red rivers" in 1999 was a commercial success in France with about 500,000 copies sold and started his career as one of the most known French author of thrillers. His books have been translated in more than 30 languages and sold millions of copies.

In 2000 "Blood Red Rivers" is adapted as a movie by Mathieu Kassovitz and is also successful with 3.2 million tickets in France.

== Bibliography ==
- Le Vol des cigognes (1994)
  - English translation: Flight of the Storks
- Les rivières pourpres (1998)
  - English translation: Blood Red Rivers (1999)
  - Film adaptation: The Crimson Rivers (2000)
  - TV series: The Crimson Rivers (2018-)
- Le Concile de Pierre (2001)
  - English translation: The Stone Council
  - Film adaptation: The Stone Council (2006)
- L'Empire des loups (2003)
  - English translation: The Empire of the Wolves
  - Film adaptation: L'Empire des loups (2005)
- La Ligne noire (2004)
- Le Serment des limbes (2007)
- Misèrere (2008)
- La Forêt des Mânes (2009)
- Le Passager (2011)
- Kaiken (2012)
- Lontano (2015)
- Congo Requiem (2016)
- La Terre des morts (2018)
- La Dernière Chasse (2019)
- Le Jour des Cendres (2020)
- Les Promises (2021)
- Rouge Karma (2023)
