= Léonor Serraille =

French screenwriter and director

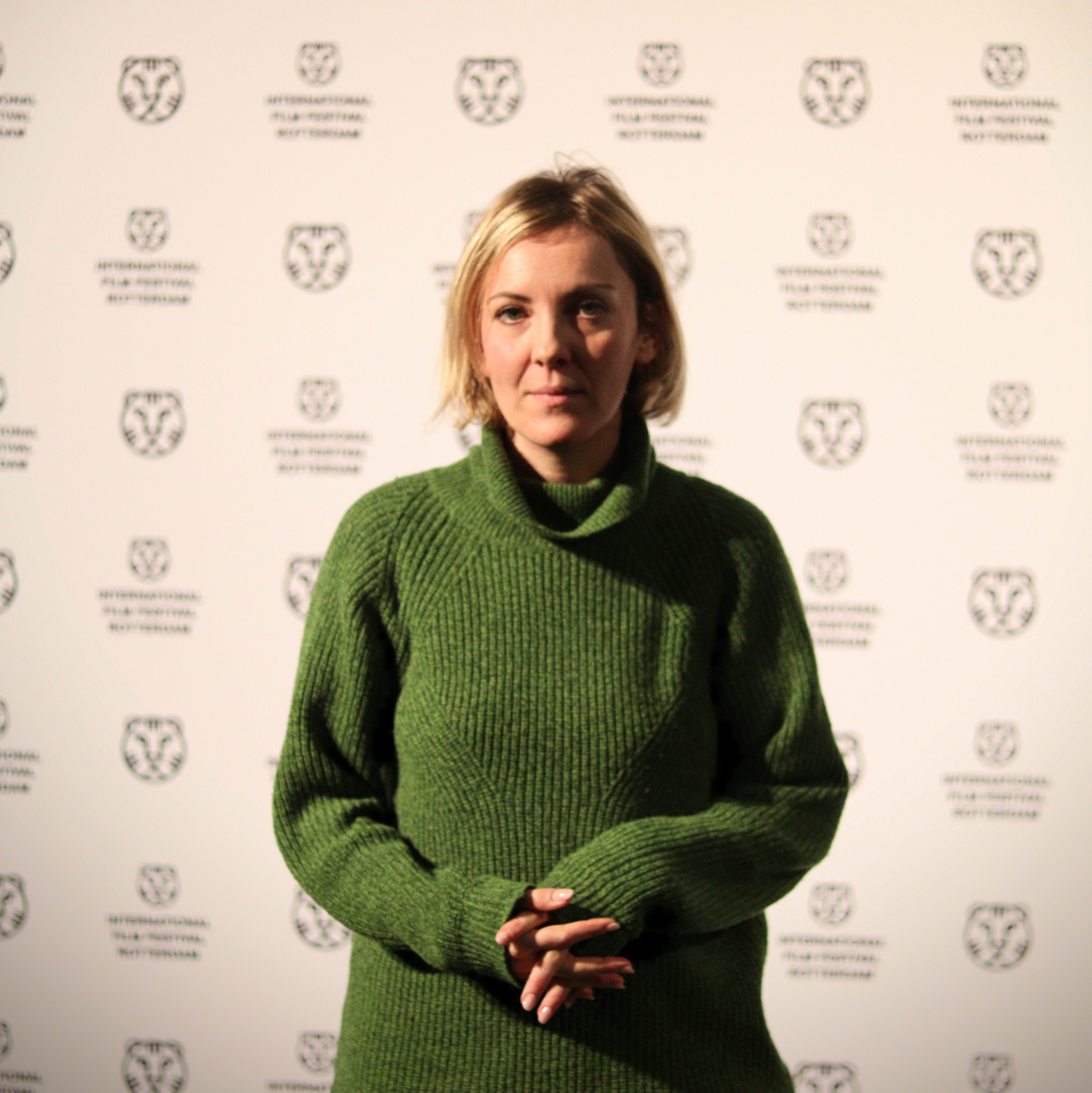
- Born: 1986 (age 39–40); Lyon

Léonor Serraille (born 1986) is a French screenwriter and director.

== Biography ==
Serraille was born in Lyon and was a student at La Fémis. In 2013 Serraille completed her master's degree in general and comparative literature at the Sorbonne-Nouvelle University.

== Career ==
Her first feature film Montparnasse Bienvenue was a critical success at the Cannes Film Festival in 2017 and Serraille won the Caméra d'Or for the best debut film. The film also won the prize for best French feature film at the 6th Champs-Élysées Film Festival in Paris.

In 2022, Serraille directed the drama film Mother and Son, the film had its world premiere at the main competition of the 2022 Cannes Film Festival.

=== Films ===
- Montparnasse Bienvenue (2017)
- Mother and Son (2022)
- Ari (2025), Selected in competition of 75th Berlin International Film Festival and will have its world premiere in February 2025.
