= Joël Karekezi =

Rwandan screenwriter (born 1985)

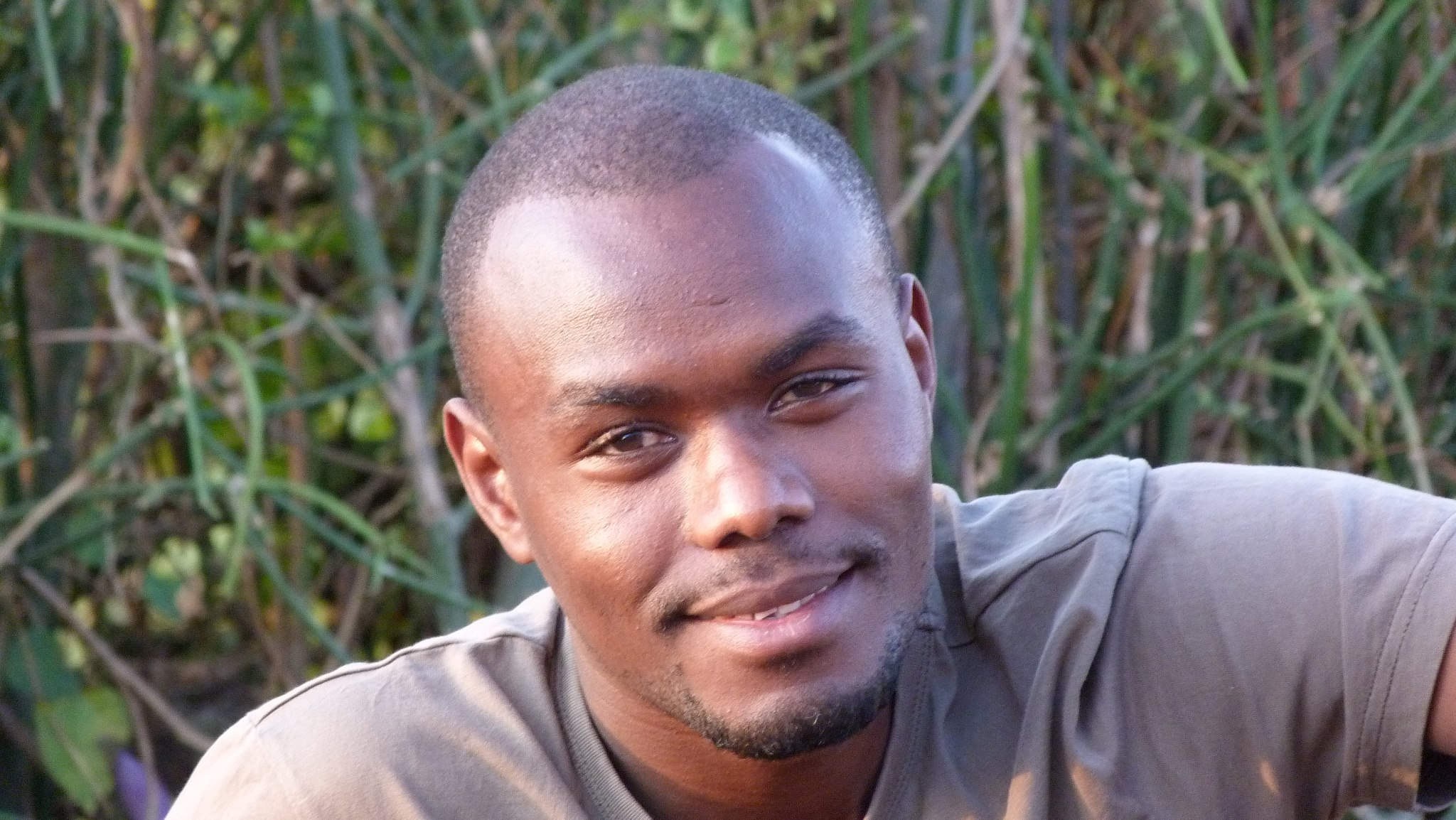
- Karekezi in 2012
- Born: Karekezi Joël; 12 December 1985 (age 40); Rubavu, Rwanda
- Education: Maisha Film Lab
- Occupation: Filmmaker
- Years active: 2009–present

Joël Karekezi (born 12 December 1985) is a Rwandan screenwriter, film director and film producer. His films, such as Imbabazi: The Pardon (2013) and The Mercy of the Jungle (2018), often deal with issues of conflict and war, alongside the possibility of forgiveness and hope. The Mercy of the Jungle's awards include FESPACO's the Etalon d’Or de Yennenga, Best Film and Best Actor at the Africa Movie Academy Awards, Best Screenplay at the Khouribga African Film Festival, and the Jury's Best Feature Narrative Award at the Pan African Film Festival (PAFF).

== Early life and education ==
Karekezi was born in Rubavu, Rwanda on 12 December 1985. One of three siblings, he has a brother and a sister. He is a survivor of the 1994 Rwandan genocide against the Tutsis during which his father was killed. He subsequently took refuge in neighboring Democratic Republic of the Congo (DRC).

He studied Biology and Chemistry for three years at the Kigali Institute of Education (since renamed The University of Rwanda-College of Education), and then went on to study filmmaking through Cinécours, a Canadian online film school where he received a diploma in Film Directing in 2008. In 2009 he attended a screenwriting course at the Maisha Film Lab in Uganda, where he wrote the screenplay for what would become his first film, The Pardon.

== Career ==
In 2010 Karekezi directed his first film, The Pardon, from a script developed at the Maisha Film Lab. The short film follows Manzi upon his release from prison after 15 years, and his coming to terms with having murdered his best friend's family during the Rwandan genocide against the Tutsis. The film won The Golden Impala award at Amakula Film Festival in Uganda and the Best Short Film at the Silicon Valley African Film Festival. It screened at various festivals, including the Durban International Film Festival, the Zanzibar International Film Festival, the Images That Matter Short Film Festival in Ethiopia, and the Kenya International Film Festival.

Karekezi went on to direct Imbabazi: the Pardon an expanded, feature film version of The Pardon that was released in 2013. The director said of his inspiration in making The Pardon and its follow on version: “I asked myself: If I ever meet the person who killed my father: would I be able to forgive him?” So I started writing a script to try to understand the need for forgiveness and how it can happen, how this step can be taken. With the short film, I could bring this idea to life, but I needed to take this reflection even further [with my feature film]. Imbabazi was winner of Nile Grand Prize at the 2014 Luxor African Film Festival.

In 2018 Karekezi's second feature, The Mercy of the Jungle, premiered at the Toronto International Film Festival. The story follows two Rwandan soldiers separated from their military unit at the beginning of the Second Congo War and their struggle to survive in a hostile jungle environment amidst intense armed conflict. The film went on to secure numerous awards including in 2019, the Etalon d’Or de Yennenga, the top prize at FESPACO and Best Film at the Africa Movie Academy Awards.

In 2023 it was announced that Karekezi was attached as scriptwriter to Bisesero: A Daughter’s Story about a little known but true story of a civilian resistance group who fought for months to survive the Genocide against the Tutsi. He is co-writer with the Nigerian filmmaker Ema Edosio-Deelen who is slated to direct the feature film.

Since 2023, Karekezi has been developing Capitaine Mbaye, a Rwanda, Belgium, France and Senegal co-production that he is to direct and wrote the script for. Set in the early 1990s, the story follows the real-life Senegalese Captain Mbaye Diagne who is deployed to Kigali as UN observer in the midst of its ethnic civil war. Against the orders of his superiors, he repeatedly puts his life in danger to save lives when the massacres of the Rwandan genocide against the Tutsis begin. Organizations that have contributed to the funding of the project include the Organisation internationale de la francophonie (OIF), the Red Sea Fund, and the Film and Audiovisual Industry Promotion Fund (FOPICA) from Senegal's Ministry of Youth, Sports and Culture.

Karekezi's film credits also include Survivor from 2010.

== Filmography ==
Year	Title	Credited as			Notes	Ref(s)
Year	Title	Director	Writer	Producer	Notes	Ref(s)
2009	The Pardon	Yes	Yes		Short film	
2013	Imbabazi: The Pardon	Yes	Yes	Yes		
2018	The Mercy of the Jungle	Yes	Yes	Yes		
