= Montparnasse Bienvenue (film) =

2017 film by Léonor Serraille

- Theatrical release poster
- French: Jeune Femme
- Directed by: Léonor Serraille
- Written by: Léonor Sérraille
- Produced by: Sandra da Fonseca
- Starring: Laetitia Dosch; Souleymane Seye Ndiaye; Léonie Simaga; Nathalie Richard; Erika Sainte; Lilas-Rose Gilberti-Poisot; Audrey Bonnet
- Cinematography: Emilie Noblet
- Edited by: Clémence Carré
- Music by: Julie Roué
- Production company: Blue Monday Productions
- Distributed by: Shellac
- Release dates: 23 May 2017 (Cannes); 1 November 2017 (France)
- Running time: 97 minutes
- Country: France
- Language: French
- Budget: $1.2 million
- Box office: $423,747

Montparnasse Bienvenue (French: Jeune Femme, lit. 'Young Woman') is a 2017 French comedy-drama film written and directed by Léonor Serraille. It stars Laetitia Dosch as Paula, a young woman who recently returned to Paris after years living abroad and forced to forge a new life for herself after being abruptly dumped by her wealthy boyfriend.

The film had its world premiere in the Un Certain Regard section of the 70th Cannes Film Festival on 23 May 2017, where it won the Caméra d'Or.

== Plot ==
After her wealthy boyfriend Joachim locks her out of their shared apartment, Paula screams to be let back in and is taken to a mental ward. Escaping the ward she returns to Joachim's apartment and discovers he has locked out her cat as well.

Having only recently returned from years abroad in Mexico, Paula has no job and few friends. After quickly exhausting what little money she has, and angering her friends, she turns to the mother she ran away from years earlier, only to be quickly rejected. While riding the subway, she meets a woman, Yuki, who mistakes her for a former classmate. Desperate for help, Paula plays along and allows Yuki to buy her groceries in order to help tide her over.

Paula manages to lie her way into a live-in nanny job she has no qualifications for. She also takes a second job working at a lingerie store at the mall where she befriends Osman, a standoffish security guard who warns her that the women at that store never last long.

Just as things begin to settle for Paula, she begins to hit a series of setbacks. As her relationship with Lila, the child she is nannying, begins to warm up, her relationship with Lila's mother grows colder. Lila's mother makes her get rid of her cat, which she gives to Osman for safekeeping. Paula begins to forget about Joachim, but discovers she is pregnant with his child. Despite her precarious financial situation and her lack of a support system, she contemplates keeping the child.

Paula meets Yuki again and brings her back to her home. Yuki accidentally discovers that Paula is not her former classmate and Paula tearfully apologizes and offers to reimburse her for the money she spent on her. Yuki forgives her and the two have sex. Later, learning from Lila that she is on the verge of being fired, she returns to her mother's house, this time refusing to be sent away and finally reconnecting with her.

Joachim, who has not heard from Paula for sometime, tracks her down to her job in the mall where she tells him she is pregnant. They meet for dinner, where Joachim offers to take care of her and their child. After the dinner, she goes to Osman's house to collect her cat and the two kiss.

Later she goes to meet Joachim to tell him she has decided to have an abortion. Joachim attempts to rape Paula but she successfully fights him off. Paula has the abortion and leaves her nannying job.

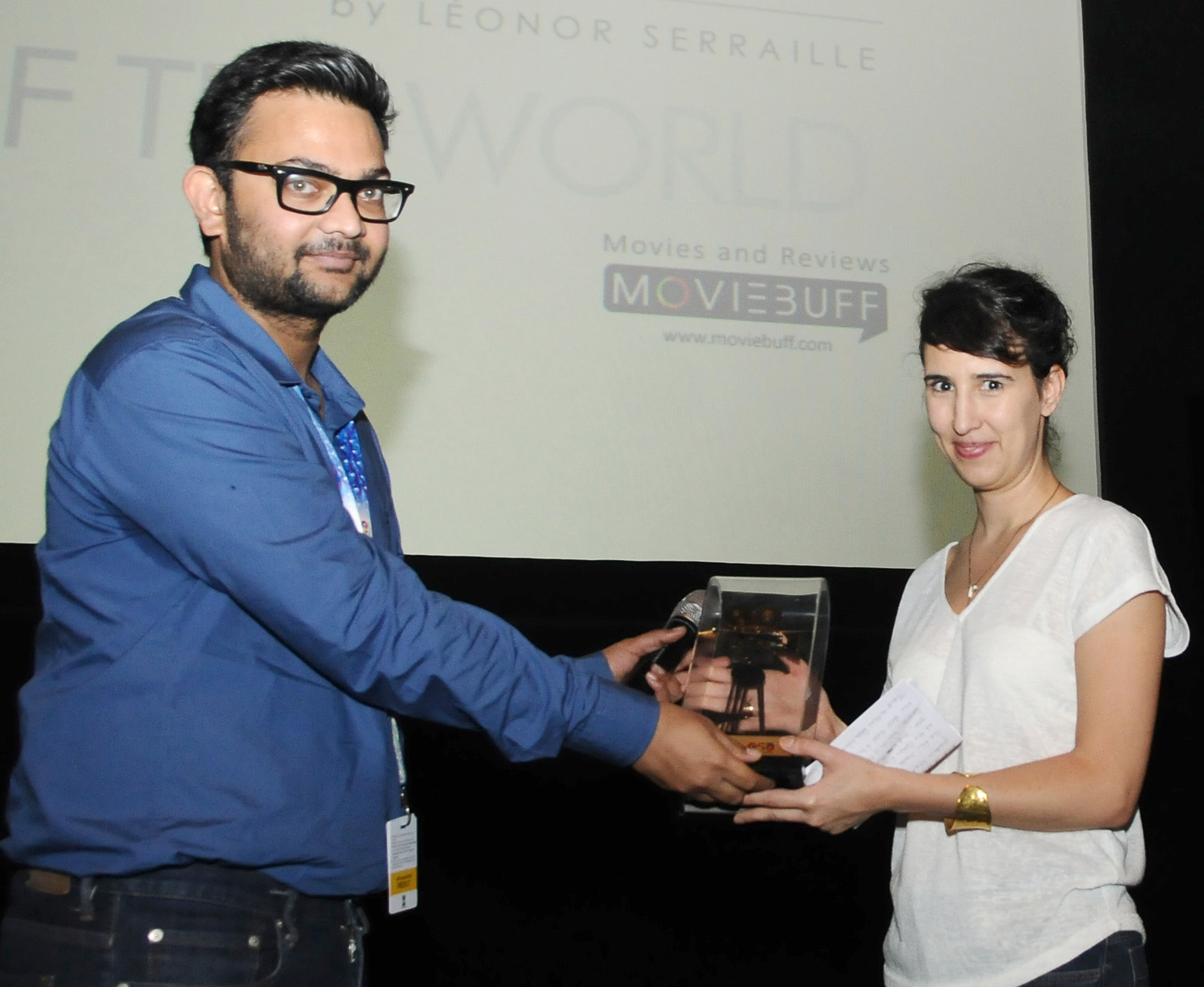
Producer Sandra da Fonseca at the presentation of the film at IFFI (2017)

== Cast ==
- Laetitia Dosch as Paula
- Grégoire Monsaingeon as Joachim
- Souleymane Seye Ndiaye as Osman
- Léonie Simaga as Yuki
- Erika Sainte as Lila's mother
- Lilas-Rose Gilberti-Poisot as Lila
- Audrey Bonnet as doctor
- Nathalie Richard as Paula's mother
- Jean-René Lemoine

== Reception ==
On review aggregator website Rotten Tomatoes, the film holds an approval rating of 97%, based on 38 reviews, and an average rating of 7.65/10. On Metacritic, the film has a weighted average score of 76 out of 100, based on 8 critics, indicating "generally favorable reviews".
