= 15th Africa Movie Academy Awards =

2019 film awards ceremony

- Date: 27 October 2019
- Site: Landmark Event Centre, Lagos, Nigeria
- Hosted by: Kemi Lala Akindoju, Lorenzo Menakaya, Funnybone

Highlights
- Best Film: The Mercy of the Jungle
- Most awards: The Mercy of the Jungle (4)
- Most nominations: The Delivery Boy, Sew the Winter to My Skin (13)

The 2019 Africa Movie Academy Awards ceremony was held on Sunday 27 October 2019 at the Landmark Event Centre in Lagos, Nigeria. The ceremony recognized and honored excellence among directors, actors, and writers in the film industry. The awards night was hosted by Kemi Lala Akindoju, Lorenzo Menakaya and Funnybone. After receiving up to 700 film entries submitted between 21 October 2018 and 26 January 2019, the organizers of the ceremony announced the nominees on 19 September 2019. The Delivery Boy and Sew the Winter to My Skin led with 13 nominations each while The Burial of Kojo and Redemption followed with 10 each. The Mercy of the Jungle won in the categories Best Film, Achievement in Costume Design, Achievement in Makeup and Best Actor in a Leading Role. Political thriller King of Boys took home three awards on that same night, including awards for Best Actress in a Supporting Role, Best Actress in a Leading Role, as well as Best Nigerian Film.

== Awards ==
Winners are listed first and highlighted in boldface.

Best Film	Best Director
**The Mercy of the Jungle – Rwanda**; Rafiki – Kenya; The Delivery Boy – Nigeria; Ellen: The Ellen Pakkies Story – South Africa; Sew the Winter to My Skin – South Africa; Redemption – Mozambique; King of Boys – Nigeria; Urgent – Morocco	**Jahmil X.T. Qubeka – Sew the Winter to My Skin**; Wanuri Kahiu – Rafiki; Adekunle Adejuyigbe – The Delivery Boy; Daryne Joshua – Ellen: The Ellen Pakkies Story; Kemi Adetiba – King of Boys; Mohcine Besri – Urgent; Mickey Fonseca – Redemption; Joël Karekezi – The Mercy of the Jungle
Best Actor in a Leading Role	Best Actress in a Leading Role
**Marc Zinga – The Mercy of the Jungle**; Gabriel Afolayan – Gold Statue; Joseph Otsiman – The Burial of Kojo; Chinedu Ikedieze – Lara and the Beat; Jimmy Jean-Louis – Rattlesnakes; Gil Alexandre – Redemption; Ezra Mabengeza – Sew the Winter to My Skin; Ayoub Bombwe – Fatuma	**Sola Sobowale – King of Boys**; Sheila Munyiva – Rafiki; Rita Dominic – Light in the Dark; Jill Levenberg – Ellen: The Ellen Pakkies Story; Beatrice Taisamo – Fatuma; Seyi Shay – Lara and the Beat; Jemima Osunde – The Delivery Boy; Samantha Mugatsia – Rafiki
Best Actor in a Supporting Role	Best Actress in a Supporting Role
**Jarrid Geduld – Ellen: The Ellen Pakkies Story**; Reminisce – King of Boys; Zolisa Xaluva – Sew the Winter to My Skin; Akah Nnani – Banana Island Ghost; Kanayo O. Kanayo – Up North; Kobina Amissah-Sam – The Burial of Kojo; Bucci Franklin – Knockout Blessing	**Adesua Etomi – King of Boys**; Joke Silva – Light in the Dark; Eniola Shobayo – Knockout Blessing; Linda Ejiofor – Knockout Blessing; Kandyse McClure – Sew the Winter to My Skin; Arlete Bombe - Redemption
Achievement in Costume Design	Achievement in Makeup
**The Mercy of the Jungle**; Lara and the Beat; Rafiki; Sew the Winter to My Skin; King of Boys; Urgent (2018 film); Mabata Bata; Light in the Dark	**The Mercy of the Jungle**; Make Room; Gold Statue; Veronica's Wish; Sew the Winter to My Skin; The Burial of Kojo; Before the Vows
Achievement in Cinematography	Achievement in Production Design
**Sew the Winter to My Skin**; Mabata Bata; Mother, I Am Suffocating. This Is My Last Film About You; Redemption; Rafiki; The Delivery Boy; The Burial of Kojo	**Redemption**; Rafiki; Urgent; Ellen: The Ellen Pakkies Story; Sew the Winter to My Skin; The Delivery Boy; The Burial of Kojo; The Mercy of the Jungle
Achievement in Editing	Achievement in Screenplay
**Rafiki**; The Delivery Boy; The Burial of Kojo; The Last Victims; Gold Statue; Diamond in the Sky; Sew the Winter to My Skin; The Mercy of the Jungle	**Redemption**; The Last Victims; Rafiki; The God Statue; Diamond in the Sky; Lara and the Beat; Up North; The Delivery Boy
Best Film in An African Language	Best Nigerian Film
**Rafiki**– Kenya; Make Room – Nigeria; Mabata Bata – Mozambique; Azali – Ghana; Bahasha (The Envelope) – Tanzania	**King of Boys**; The Delivery Boy; Up North; Lara and the Beat; Knockout Blessing; Gold Statue; Makeroom
Best Short Film	Best Animation
**A Tune of Kora** – Senegal; The Fisherman – Ghana; ICYASHA – Rwanda; Mma Moeketsi – South Africa; NAMOW2018 – Kenya; Vagabond – Ghana; Measure of a Woman – South Africa; Motswakwa – Botswana; Tonight’s Opening Act – Egypt; Hello Rain – Nigeria	**Choices** – Nigeria; Afrogames – Burkina Faso; Isolated – Kenya; Kitwana Journey – Kenya
Best Documentary	Best Film by an African Living Abroad
**Khartoum Offside** – Sudan; Le loups d'or de Balole – Burkina Faso; Sur Les Traces de Mamani Abdoulaye – Niger; No Gold for Kalsaka – Burkina Faso; Mother, I Am Suffocating. This Is My Last Film About You – Lesotho; Skin – Nigeria; Golden Fish, African Fish – Senegal; Djambar, Sembene the Unsubmissive – Cameroon; The State Against Mandela – South Africa	**Julius Amedume** – Rattlesnakes; Tosin Coker – Lara and the Beat; Robert O. Peters – Makeroom
Best Diaspora Short Film	Best Diaspora Documentary
**Bail** – United Kingdom; Oath Bound – United Kingdom; Fevah – USA; I Am Superman – Brazil	**My Friend Fela – Brazil**; Wax Print 1 FABRIC, 4 continent – United Kingdom; Drugs as Weapons Against Us – USA; Dare to Dream – USA/Cuba; The Guardian of No Return – Guadalope
Best Diaspora Feature	Best Soundtrack
**Hero – Trinidad and Tobago/Canada**; Traffik – USA; Olympia – USA; Sprinter – Jamaica; Nine Nights – United Kingdom	**Mabata Bata**; Subira; Farewell Ella Bella; Redemption; The Delivery Boy; Lara and the Beat; Sew the Winter to My Skin; The Mercy of the Jungle
Best Visual Effects	Best Sound
**The Delivery Boy**; Sew the Winter to My Skin; Make Room; Knockout Blessing; Mabata Bata; The Burial of Kojo; King of Boys	**Mabata Bata**; Urgent; Redemption; Make Room; The Last Victim; The Delivery Boy; The Burial of Kojo; Sew the Winter to My Skin
Most Promising Actor	Best First Feature Film by a Director
**Cynthia Dankwa – The Burial of Kojo**; Catherine Credo – Fatuma; Youssef Alaoui – Urgent; Angel Onyinyechi Unigwe – Light in the Dark; Emilio Bilo – Mabata Bata; Jamma Ibrahim – The Delivery Boy	**The Burial of Kojo – Blitz Bazawule – Ghana**; The Delivery Boy – Adekunle Adejuyigbe – Nigeria; Subira – Sippy Chadha – Tanzania; Before the Vows – Nicole Amarteifio – Ghana
