= Cathryn Credo =

Tanzanian actress and model (born 1997)

Catherine credo
- Born: Catherine Credo Masanja; August 2, 1997 (age 29); Dar es Salaam, Tanzania
- Occupations: Actress, model
- Known for: Hadithi za Kumekucha: Fatuma (2018)
- Mother: Mwajuma Isa
- Awards: 2018 ZIFF, Best Actress
- Website: netflix.com

Catherine credo (born 2nd August 1997) is a Tanzanian actress best known for playing the role of Neema and Hidaya in (FATUMA & THE ENVELOPE) both showing on Netflix, Bibie in a TV series KOMBOLELA (2021), Frida in the movie FRIDA (2022), Dorice in TV series SINIA (2022), Mwahamu in a short Film NIA (2023) a film by Seko Shamte, Kidawa in the film KIDAWA (2023) showing on Showmax and in a TV series DHOHAR (2024) as Sabina Showing on DSTV.

== Career ==
For the 2018 Swahili language Jordan Riber film she was featured in as "Neema" titled, Hadithi za Kumekucha: Fatuma, also starring Beatrice Taisamo and Ayoub Bombwe, she was nominated and awarded a "Best Actress" award in the Swahili Movies special category at the 2018 Zanzibar International Film Festival (ZIFF).

Still in 2018, she again featured in Jordan Riber's Swahili language drama titled, Bahasha, in which she played the role of Hidaya. Other featured stars include Ayoub Bombwe and Godliver Gordian.

In the 15th Africa Movie Academy Awards (AMAA), she was nominated in the "AMAA 2019 Award For Best Young/Promising Actor", for the film, Fatuma, won by Ghana's Cynthia Dankwa.

== Filmography ==
Year	Film	Role	Notes	Ref.
2023	Dhohar	Sabina	TV Series	
2022	Ndoano	Somoe	Drama	
2021-2022	Kombolela	Bibie	TV Series	
2018	Bahasha - The Envelope	Actress (Hidaya)	Drama	
2018	Haditha za Kumekucha: Fatuma	Actress (Neema)	Drama	

== Accolades ==
Year	Event	Prize	Recipient	Result
2019	AMAA	Best Young/Promising Actor	Herself	Nominated
2018	ZIFF	Best Actress	Herself	Won
