= Godliver Gordian =

Tanzanian actress

- Occupation: Actress
- Known for: Bahasha (2018); Aisha (2015); Siri ya Mtungi (2012)
- Awards: Zanzibar International Film Festival 2016; Tanzania Film Festival Awards 2021

Godliver Gordian is a Tanzanian actress. She is a part of the New York-based humanitarian organization, Global Medical Relief Fund, and has helped albino graduates find jobs by speaking to employers on their behalf, irrespective of the fears associated with albinos in Tanzania.

== Career ==
Gordian was starred in a Jordan Riber 2012 half-hour Swahili language TV Series titled, Siri ya Mtungi, in which she played the role of "Cheusi". The film also featured the likes of Beatrice Taisamo, Yvonne Cherrie and others.

In 2015, she acted the leading role in a Tanzanian drama film by Chande Omar titled, Aisha.

In 2016, she was nominated for The African Film and Arts Festival (TAFF) awards in the Best Actress category, for her role in the film, Aisha. For the same role and film, she was nominated for the Azam Bongo Movie Awards in the Best Actress category at the 2016 Zanzibar International Film Festival (ZIFF), which she won.

She was also featured in the 2016 comedy-drama film by Seko Shamte titled, Homecoming.

She was the casting director in the 2017 multi-award-winning Tanzanian Swahili language drama film by Amil Shivji titled, T-JUNCTION, starring: Magdalena Christopher, Hawa Alisa (Hawa Ally), Cojack Chilo.

In 2018, she was starred in Jordan Riber's Swahili language drama film, Bahasha (The Envelope), in which she played the role of Hidaya. Other featured stars include Ayoub Bombwe and Godliver Gordian.

She also featured in Seko Shamte's Binti, a Tanzanian drama film slated to be released in 2021. She played the role of "Rose".

== Filmography ==
Year	Film	Role	Notes	Ref.
2023	Jasiri	Rose Ambani	Short film	
2021	Binti	Actress (Rose)	Drama	
2018	Bahasha (The Envelope)	Actress (Zawadi)	Drama	
2017	T-Junction	Casting director	Drama	
2016	Homecoming	Actress	Comedy drama	
2015	Aisha	Actress (Aisha)	Drama	
2012	Siri ya Mtungi	Actress (Cheusi)	Short TV series; Drama	

== Accolades ==
Year	Event	Prize	Recipient	Result
2016	The African Film Festival	Best Actress	Aisha	Nominated
2016	Zanzibar International Film Festival	Best Actress	Aisha	Won
2021	Tanzania Film Festival Awards	Best Actress	Jua Kali	Won
