= Blitz the Ambassador =

Ghanaian musician and filmmaker (born 1982)

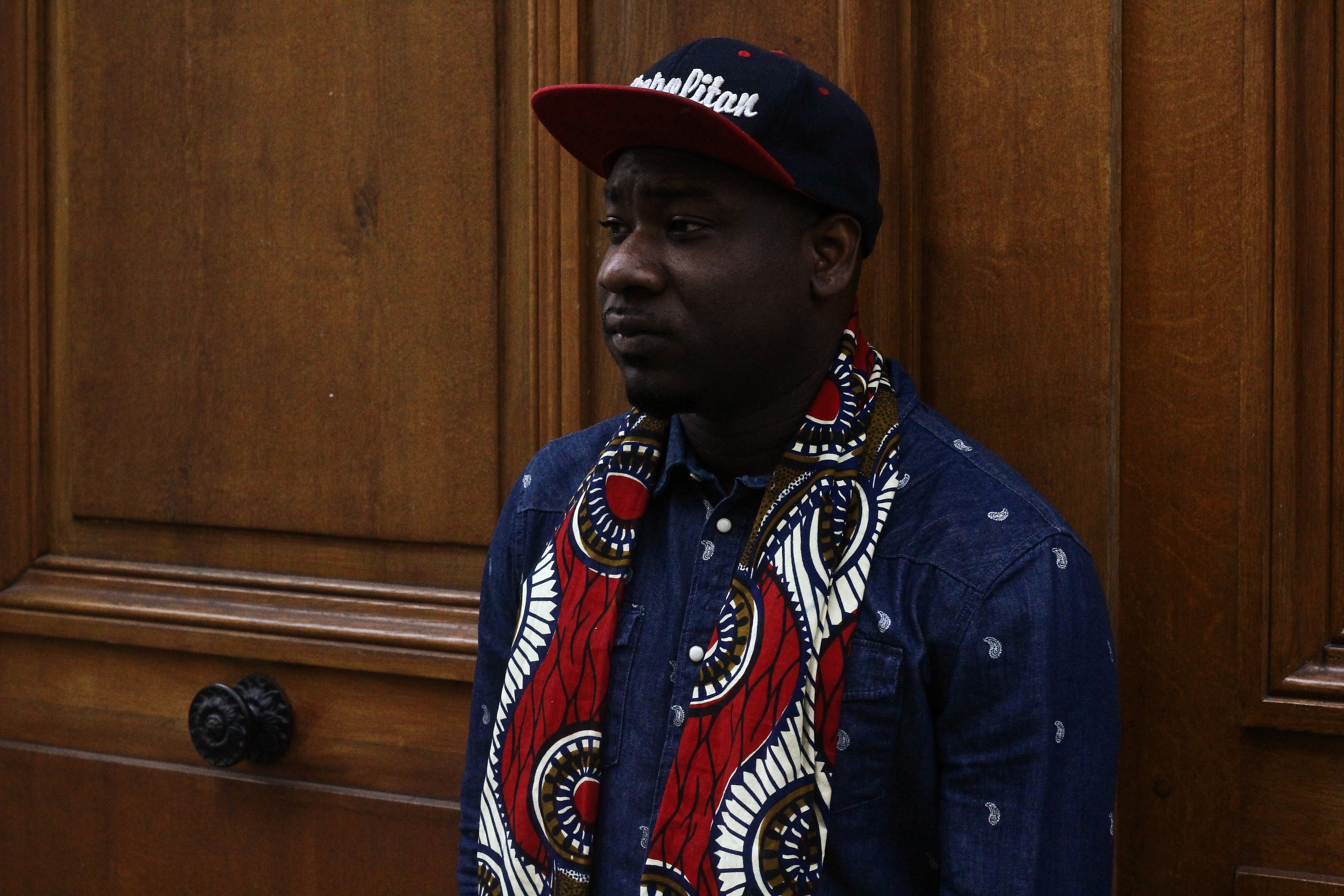
- Blitz Bazawule in 2014

Background information
- Also known as: Blitz Bazawule
- Born: Samuel Bazawule; 19 April 1982 (age 44); Accra, Ghana
- Occupations: filmmaker; author; visual artist; rapper; singer; songwriter; record producer
- Years active: 2000–present
- Musical career
- Genres: Afrobeat; hip hop
- Instrument: Vocals
- Labels: Reprisal; Jakarta

Samuel Bazawule (born 19 April 1982), known professionally as Blitz Bazawule and Blitz the Ambassador, is a Ghanaian filmmaker, author, visual artist, rapper, singer-songwriter, and record producer.

He started his career in the late 2000s, publishing four studio albums and being awarded the Vilcek Prize for Creative Promise in Contemporary Music. Blitz made his debut as a film director with The Burial of Kojo (2018), and co-directed the musical film Black Is King (2020) alongside Beyoncé, receiving his first Grammy Award nomination. He directed the musical film adaptation The Color Purple (2023). In 2024 Variety listed him as one of the "10 Directors to Watch for 2024".

== Early life ==
Samuel Bazawule was born in Accra, Ghana, on 19 April 1982. He is the third of four children and attended Achimota School. While in school, he amassed awards for his visual art, but later developed an obsession with hip-hop music after hearing his older brother play the Public Enemy album It Takes a Nation of Millions to Hold Us Back. Drawing on his love for history and social observation, Bazawule began to research and write historically loaded rhymes for which he became famous in school.

== Career ==
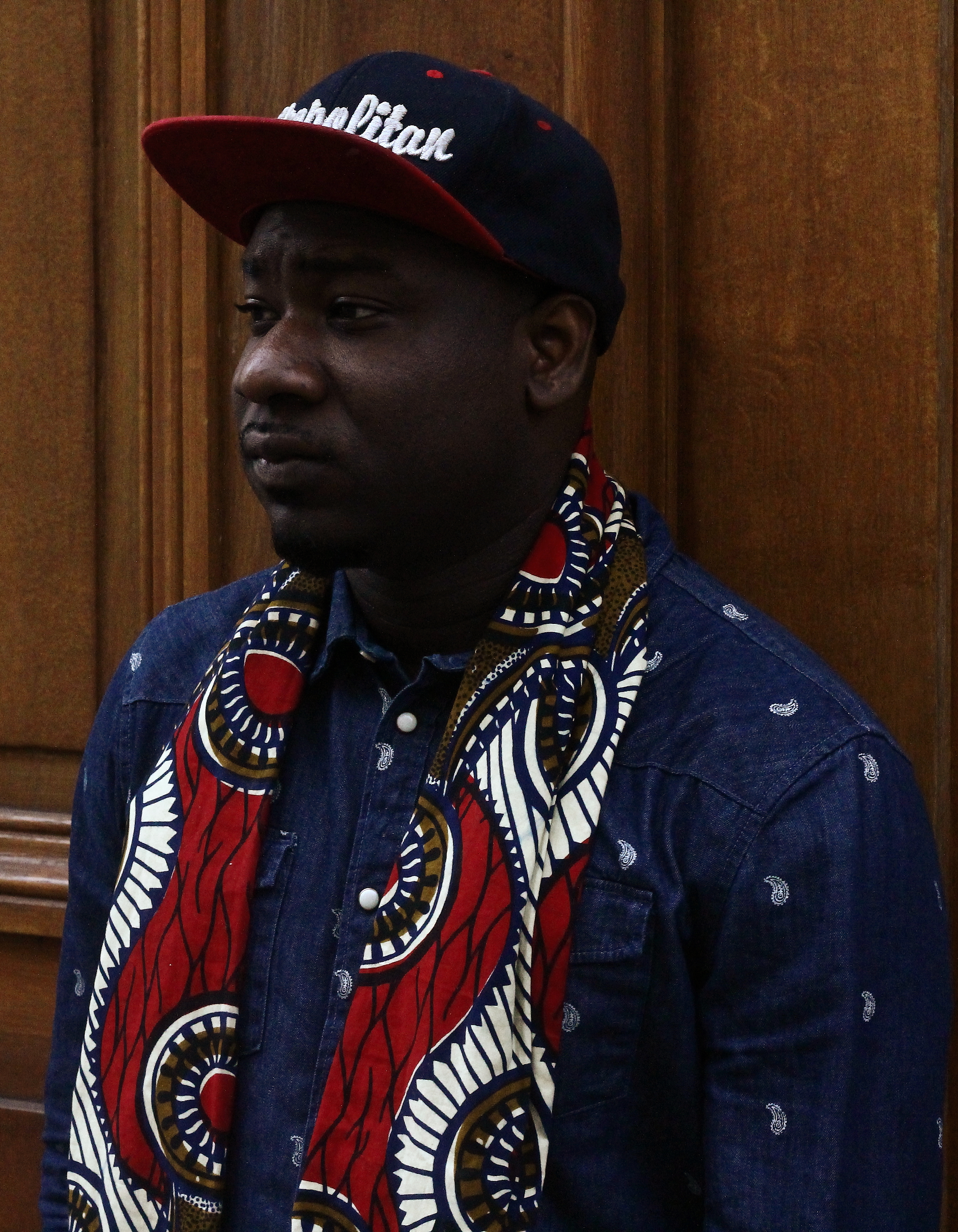
Blitz the Ambassador in 2014

After graduation from Achimota School in 2000, Bazawule was first recognized by Ghanaian Ace producer Hammer of The Last Two. Blitz was asked to come to the studio the next day after impressing Hammer with his skills. He recorded a verse on the song "Deeba" and received an award for Best New Artist at the 2000 Ghana Music Awards. In 2001, Blitz moved to the United States to study at Kent State University in Ohio, where he graduated with a bachelor's degree in Business Administration. In those years he performed at several live shows and opening for rappers such as Rakim. In 2004 he self-released the album Soul Rebel, under the moniker Blitz.

After graduation, Blitz moved to New York City. There, he recorded another album, Double Consciousness (2005), and more recently he released Stereotype. The album draws from his diverse musical background. In order to achieve the live sound he was looking for, he formed a band, The Embassy Ensemble, and brushed off his own djembe skills. He established a label, Embassy MVMT, and is now connected to The Roots community initiative Okayplayer.

In late 2009, Blitz the Ambassador was chosen as of one Beyond Race magazine's "50 Emerging Artists". In 2015, Blitz received the Vilcek Prize for Creative Promise in Contemporary Music. In 2011, he released "Feelin' High" with the French singer Ben Mazue, and in 2012, he was featured on the album Tetra by the French electronic crew C2C. Blitz has also frequently collaborated with Professor A.L.I. featuring on "Things Fall Apart" along with Raekwon in 2011, on the remix "Things Still Fall Apart" in 2012, and on his song "The Mic Shall Inherit The Earth" off of the "XFactor" album in 2015. In 2016 he published his fourth studio album Diasporadical and the related short film Diasporadical Trilogia, a triptych with installments set in Accra, New York City and Salvador, Bahia.

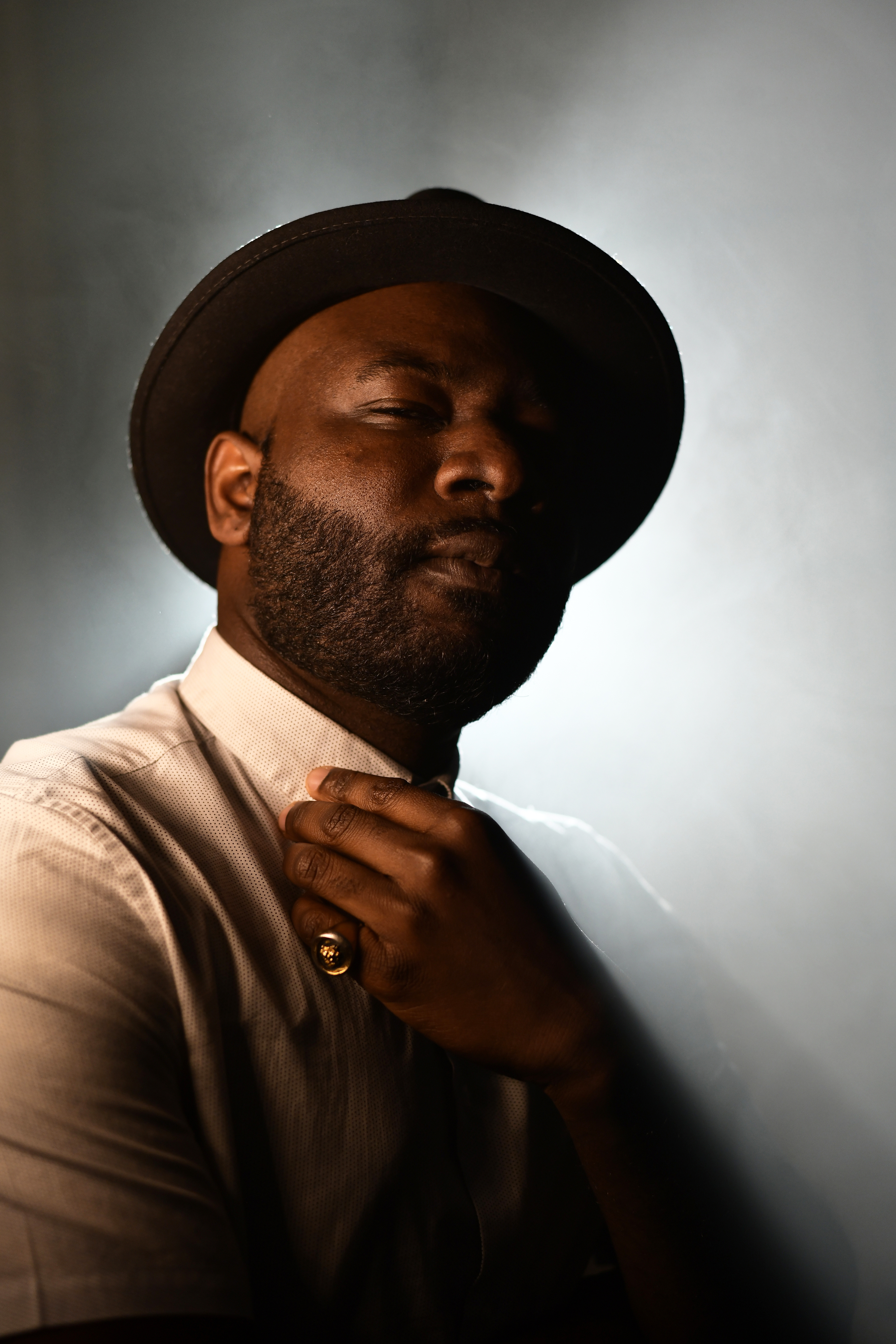
Blitz The Ambassador in 2019

In 2018, Blitz directed and wrote his debut film The Burial of Kojo, which featured actors Ama K. Abebrese, Joseph Otsiman, Joyce Anima Misa Amoah and Cynthia Dankwa. The film was acquired by Ava DuVernay’s independent film studio Array for a theatrical and a Netflix release, and premiered at the 2018 Urban World film festival in New York. It received nine nominations at the 15th Africa Movie Academy Awards, winning for Best First Feature Film by a Director, and won the Grand Nile Prize at the Luxor African Film Festival.

In 2019, Blitz was one of the directors featured in Beyoncé's visual album The Lion King: The Gift and in the related Walt Disney Pictures's musical film Black Is King, for which he was nominated for Best Music Film at the 63rd Annual Grammy Awards. Blitz starred in the 2019 Whitney Biennial curated by Rujeko Hockley and Jane Panetta. Blitz is also a 2019 Senior TED (conference) Fellow, and founded the Africa Film Society, an organization focused on the preservation of classic African cinema. He was the recipient of one of the Guggenheim Fellowships for his influence of Ghana.

In 2020, it was announced that Bazawule was set to direct The Color Purple, a film adaptation of Alice Walker's book of the same name and the Broadway musical produced by Oprah Winfrey. Winfrey herself produced the film with Quincy Jones, Scott Sanders and Steven Spielberg. The film starred Fantasia Barrino, Taraji P. Henson, Colman Domingo and Danielle Brooks. It was released in the United States on 25 December 2023 by Warner Bros. Pictures. The film earned him nominations for the Critics' Choice Movie Award for Best Picture and a Black Reel Award for Outstanding Director.

Bazawule's first book, The Scent of Burnt Flowers, was published on June 28, 2022. On 17 March 2022, it was announced that FX would produce a six-episode miniseries based on the book, with Bazawule directing and producing as well as Yahya Abdul-Mateen II starring.

Following the release of The Color Purple, in March 2024, it was announced that Bazawule would reunite with Color Purple distributor Warner Bros. for his next film, Black Samurai, basing it on the legendary Yasuke, an African warrior who became the first Black samurai.

== Discography ==
=== Studio albums ===
- 2009: Stereotype
- 2011: Native Sun
- 2014: Afropolitan Dreams
- 2016: Diasporadical

=== Soundtrack albums ===
- 2019: The Burial of Kojo

=== EPs ===
- 2004: Soul Rebel
- 2005: Double Consciousness
- 2009: StereoLive
- 2013: The Warm Up

== Filmography ==
Short film

- 2011: Native Sun
- 2016: Diasporadical Trilogia

Feature film

- 2018: The Burial of Kojo
- 2020: Black Is King
- 2023: The Color Purple

TV series

- 2020: Cherish the Day
- TBA: The Scent of Burnt Flowers

== Awards and nominations ==
Year	Award	Category	Work	Result	Ref.
2019	Africa Movie Academy Awards	Best First Feature Film by a Director	The Burial of Kojo	Won	
2019	Luxor African Film Festival	Grand Nile Prize (Long Narrative)	The Burial of Kojo	Won	
2021	NAACP Image Awards	Outstanding Directing in a Television Movie or Special	Black is King	Nominated	
2021	Grammy Awards	Best Music Film	Black is King	Nominated	
2021	Black Reel Awards	Outstanding Television Documentary or Special	Black is King	Nominated	
2024	Critics' Choice Movie Awards	Best Picture	The Color Purple	Nominated	
2024	Astra Film Awards	Best Picture	The Color Purple	Nominated	.
2024	Black Reel Awards	Outstanding Director	The Color Purple	Nominated	
2024	Houston Film Critics Society Awards	Best Picture	The Color Purple	Nominated	
2024	NAACP Image Awards	Outstanding Breakthrough Creative (Motion Picture)	The Color Purple	Won	
