= Urgent (film) =

- Directed by: Mohcine Besri
- Written by: Mohcine Besri
- Produced by: Elisa Garbar; Lamia Chraibi; Michel Merkt
- Starring: Rachid Mustafa; Fatima Zahra Bennacer; Said Bey; Youssef Al-Alaoui; Ghalia Bin Zawia; Younes Bouab
- Release date: 2018
- Running time: 85 minutes
- Country: Morocco
- Language: Arabic

Urgent (Arabic: طفح الكيل) is a 2018 Moroccan drama film written and directed by Mohcine Besri. The film stars Rachid Mustafa, Fatima Zahra Bennacer, Said Bey, Youssef Al-Alaoui, Ghalia Bin Zawia and Younes Bouab. Rachid Mustapha. It was produced by Elisa Garbar, Lamia Chraibi and Michel Merkt.

The film conveys the dark side of the Moroccan public hospital situation, represented by the prevalence of bribery, neglect, overcrowding and fragility, and the trafficking of human souls groaning from the severity of pain.

== Plot ==
A man stands against the wind on the bridge, jumps and ends up in the hospital after suffering fractures. Idris and his wife Zahra go to the hospital with their sick son, and the couple is in a state of despair because of their inability to provide the necessary money for the operation. Hussain, Idris' troublesome brother, decides to give them the money he will get from a Swiss couple who will adopt his future child.

== Cast ==
- Rachid Mustapha
- Fatima Zahra Bennacer
- Youssef Alaoui
- Ayoub Layoussifi
- Said Bey
- Youssef Al-Alaoui
- Ghalia Bin Zawia
- Younes Bouab

== Reception ==
The film got premiered at the 2018 Marrakech International Film Festival (MIFF). Later in 2019, it was premiered at the Palm Springs International Film Festival and at the Tangier National Film Festival 2019.

== Awards ==
The film won Al Husseiny Abou-Deif Prize for Best Freedom Film at the Luxor African Film Festival. It received six nominations at 15th Africa Movie Academy Awards.
