= Waithira =

2019 Kenyan documentary film

- Directed by: Eva Njoki Munyiri
- Written by: Eva Njoki Munyiri
- Produced by: Team Tarbaby
- Starring: Jimmy Kamau Waithira] Eva Munyiri
- Cinematography: Stefan Gieren; Vincent Mbaya; Eva Njoki Munyiri
- Edited by: Javier Campos
- Release date: 2017
- Running time: 72 min.
- Countries: Kenya; South Africa
- Languages: English; Kikuyu

Waithira, is a 2017 Kenyan-South African biographical documentary film directed by Eva Njoki Munyiri and co-produced by director himself with Stefan Gieren and Jean Meeran for Team Tarbaby. The film deals with director Eva Njoki Munyiri's history and its intersections with forgotten Kenyan history, pop culture and the diaspora.

Waithira received positive reviews and won several awards at international film festivals. It has been screened at festivals such as South Africa's DIFF & Encounters, Luxor African Film Festival, Créteil International Women's Film Festival, etc. In 2018, the film was represented at Munich International Documentary Festival.

== Cast ==
- Jimmy Kamau Waithira
- Eva Munyiri
- Benjamin Fernandez
- Lois Waithira Kamau
- Munthoni as young Guka
- Kamau as Young Boy Messenger
- Eric Seme Otero
- Kamau wa Munyiri
- Lois Waithira Wendrock
- Kamilla Wendrock
- Thomas Wendrock
- Eli Wendrock
- Eileen Waithira Abisgold
- Leila Abisgold
- Gage Griffiths
