= Moses Khabane Khongoana =

Mosotho film director

- Citizenship: Lesotho
- Education: Limkokwing University of Creative Technology, London Institute
- Occupations: filmmaker; director
- Known for: Bullet, Lenaka-la-Balimo, True Hearts, The Legacy, Phokojoe Ea Matsatsa
- Awards: Tan Sri Dato’ Sri Paduka Limkokwing Award for Creativity and Innovation, Maluti Mountain Brewery Kickstart Grand Award 3rd Round, United Nations Lesotho Media Competition – Best Media Feature/Short Doc, Film Filminute International Film Festival 2018 – Top 5 World Best One Minute Films, Lesotho Film Festival 2015, Best Student Film Award, Lesotho Film Festival 2016, Best Feature Film Award.

Moses Khabane Khongoana is a Mosotho film director and maker.

== Early life ==
Khongoana studied Media, Communication, and Broadcasting as part of his degree in Television and Film Production at Limkokwing University of Creative Technology. His first award-winning independent film, "Bullet," was featured in several international film festivals, including the Luxor African Film Festival. He also holds a Certificate in Business Studies from the City and Guilds of London Institute. Khongoana is a member of the Motion Picture Association of Lesotho, participating in various operational groups and committees aimed at developing a formal television and film industry in Lesotho. Additionally, Khongoana has collaborated with numerous artists, NGOs, government bodies, and private institutions on various projects.

== Filmography ==
AWARDS WINNING PRODUCTIONS

Bullet (Short Film) – Producer, Director & Cinematographer • Best Short Film Award at Lesotho Film Festival 2015

Lenaka-la-Balimo (Feature Film) - Script Editor, Director, Editor &Cinematographer • Best Feature Film Award at Lesotho film festival 2016.

True Hearts (Short Film) – Writer, Animator, Director and Editor • Special Mention Award at Lesotho film festival 2017

The Legacy (Short Film) – Cinematographer and Editor • Jury Award at Lesotho Film Festival 2017

Phokojoe Ea Matsatsa (Short Film) –Director, Cinematographer & Editor • Special Mention Award at Lesotho film festival 2018

Appreciate Me (Short Documentary Film) – Producer, Director, Cinematographer & Editor • United Nations Lesotho Media Competition – Best Media Feature/Short Doc Film

== Awards ==
Tan Sri Dato’ Sri Paduka Limkokwing Award for Creativity and Innovation 2016.

Maluti Mountain Brewery Kickstart Grand Award 3rd Round

United Nations Lesotho Media Competition – Best Media Feature/Short Doc

Film Filminute International Film Festival 2018 – Top 5 World Best One Minute Films

Selected for YAFMA AWARDS 2019 - (Belgium).

Lesotho Film Festival 2015, Best Student Film Award.

Lesotho Film Festival 2016, Best Feature Film Award.

Lesotho Film Festival 2017, Special Mention Award

Lesotho Film Festival 2017, Jury Award

Lesotho Film Festival 2018, Special Mention Award

Lesotho Film Festival 2015, Certificate of Appreciation.

Lesotho Film Festival 2016, Certificate of Participation.

Lesotho Film Festival 2016, Certificate of Participation.

Lesotho Film Festival 2017, Certificate of Participation.

Lesotho Film Festival 2017, Certificate of Participation.

Lesotho Film Festival 2017, Certificate of Participation.

Lesotho Film Festival 2018, Certificate of Participation.

Lesotho Film Festival 2018, Certificate of Participation.

Golden Frames International Short Film Festival 2016, Certificate of Screening (Mumbai, India)

International Short & Independent Film Festival Dhaka 2016, Certification of Participation (Bangladesh, India)

Luxor African Film Festival 2016, Nominee (Egypt)

Ginora Film Festival 2016, Nominee (Spain)

Industry BOOST Competition 2016, Finalist (Miami, Florida)

Afro film festival “Ananse” 2016, Official selection (Colombia, U.S.A)

Indiewise virtual festival 2017, Official selection (Florida, Miami)

Wiper Film Festival 2016, Official selection (U.S.A, New York)

Josiah Media Festival 2016, Official selection (U.S.A, New York)
