= John Kepe =

- Born: c. 1898; Near Pearston, Union of South Africa.
- Died: 25 June 1952 (54); Pretoria, Union of South Africa.
- Years active: 1940–1952
- Known for: Banditry, murder, stock theft.
- Spouse: Zokile Kepe
- Children: 1 known Tsholotsho Kepe (1914-1979)
- Parent: unknown

John Kepe was a South African stock thief and murderer from Somerset East. After evading capture for 12 years, Kepe was apprehended and executed.

== Life ==
=== Early life ===
John Kepe, (more accurately spelled Khebe) from the Mpinga clan, of the Xhosa nation, was born near Pearston in the Eastern Cape around the year 1898. Kepe was arrested by Sgt. Christiaan Potgieter on separate occasions for theft and housebreaking in 1921, 1927 and 1933. The last of these arrests occurred near Pearston where Kepe had attempted an attack with an axe in an attempt to escape arrest. He was subsequently sentenced to seven years in jail.

=== Outlaw ===
In early 1940 John Keppe was released from jail having completed his sentence and started living in a cave in the Boschberg mountain around Somerset East. Before the year was out, Sgt. Potgieter was transferred to the Somerset East area and started investigating a series of shop burglaries and random incidents of theft both in Somerset East and nearby areas like Cookhouse, Kommadagga, and Longhope. Many of these crimes were never officially linked to John Kepe. While many suspects were apprehended, the petty burlguries and incidences of stock theft (mainly sheep) did not cease.

By the year 1950, local police were logging approximately one incident a week of stock theft and house burglaries from farmers in the Boschberg area. In the meantime, John Kepe had garnered a reputation among locals.

During this period of increased activity, Kepe left anonymous notes for the police and participated in search parties organized to locate him.

Kepe had succeeded in keeping the true identity of mysterious Boschberg outlaw a secret, so much so that many locals in the area did not know who Kepe was until he was eventually arrested. While a few residents of Somerset East were aware of Kepe who would descend from the mountain from time to time to socialise at the community drinking hall, residents didn't know that Kepe was the wanted notorious thief and outlaw plaguing the area around the Boschberg.

=== Murder ===
In late November 1951, the home of Dirk Goliath a local farm worker was reportedly burgled and Goliath himself had encountered a man in possession of a .22 rifle claiming to be a police officer hunting the bandit in the Boschberg area.

On 14 December 1951 Dirk Goliath, failed to return home from work. Goliath's employer, Dix Erasmus informed police and a search for Goliath was launched the same day.

Dirk Goliaths body was discovered above Rooikraans the next day. Despite an armed group of approximately 70 men searching every inch of the mountain and its surrounds, John Kepe was nimble enough to steal potatoes and burgle the farmhouse of the farm Ongegund owned by Sgt. J.P. Botha and still evade detection.

By February 22, 1952, despite increased police presence in the Boschberg area, Kepe continued his banditry and no arrests were made for either the stock theft, burglary or murder of Dirk Goliath.

=== Capture & Execution ===
On the night of 25 February, Sergeants Botha and Potgieter, as well as four constables, headed for the Boschberg again. The police had theorised that the bandit had to have been curing all the mutton he was stealing so despite the rainy weather, Botha and a Constable Mafukuzele laid an ambush near a salt shed on the farm, Grootfontein.

In a stroke of luck for the police, Kepe stumbled into the ambush party on the very same night and after a brief scuffle, Sgt. Botha drew his firearm and Kepe surrendered.

Moments after his arrest, John Kepe requested to accompany the police officers back to his cave so that he may retrieve his tobacco. Kepe then led the police to the cave where he had lived in for more than a decade.

Inside the cave, there was a wealth of stored stolen goods, including cooking utensils, supplies and clothes. Kepe further revealed two other caves he had used which had remained undiscovered prior to his capture. One cave Kepe called his “icebox’’, which was fitted with wire for hanging and curing meat, while the other was used to store more than 100 sheepskins.

Upon returning to the farm Ongegund, Sgt. Potgieter was reunited with Kepe, the man he had arrested several times many years back in Pearston.

Kepe's trial began at the magisterial court in Cradock on 19 March 1952. He arrived to the courthouse and addressed the throng of onlookers and spectators outside the courthouse by yelling “I am the Samson of the Boschberg! When the Philistines caught Samson, all the other Philistines came out to look at him just as you are doing today!’’ The trial completed on April 22 of the same year. John Kepe had confessed in full all of his crimes and was found guilty of burglary, stock theft and the murder of Dirk Goliath. Kepe was permitted to address the court and he said, pointing to the jury “If these people are without sin, then they can hang me.’’

Before being led away after the proceedings, Sgt. Potgieter and Kepe enjoyed a friendly conversation. Two months later, Kepe requested to see Potgieter again for a final time. This meeting, was the last time Kepe met with anyone outside of prison. Potgieter never discussed the details of his final meeting with Kepe shortly before Kepe’s execution.

John Kepe, the self-proclaimed "Samson of The Boschberg" was executed by hanging at the Pretoria Gallows on 25 June 1952.

== Legacy ==
- The story of Kepe's life forms the basis of Jahmil X.T. Qubeka's 2018 film Sew the Winter to My Skin which was selected as the South African entry for the Best Foreign Language Film at the 91st Academy Awards, but was ultimately not nominated.
