= Arlete Bombe =

Mozambican actress

Arlete Guilhermina Vincente Bombe
- Born: Arlete Guilhermina Bombe; Mozambique
- Occupation: Actress
- Known for: Redemption (Resgate); Wiwanana (2017)

Arlete Guilhermina "Guillermina" Vincente Bombe (born 1983) is a Mozambican actress from Maputo, Mozambique.

== Career ==
In 2017, she was featured in Iacopo Patierno's documentary titled, Wiwanana, alongside Safina Ansumane Ali, Agostino Maico Chipula and others.

She was also featured in Mickey Fonseca's 2019 award-winning film, Redemption ("Resgate" in Portuguese). The film also starred Gil Alexandre, Laquino Fonseca, Tomas Bie, Rachide Abul, Candido Quembo and others.

She was nominated in the AMAA 2019 Award For Best Actress in a Supporting Role category at the 15th Africa Movie Academy Awards (AMAA), for her role in the film, Redemption.

== Filmography ==
Year	Film	Role	Notes	Ref.
2019	Redemption (Resgate)	Actress (Mia)	Drama	
2017	Wiwanana	Actress (Self)	Documentary	

== Accolades ==
Year	Event	Prize	Recipient	Result
2019	AMAA	Award For Best Actress in a Supporting Role	Herself	Nominated
