= Binti (2021 film) =

2021 Tanzanian drama film

- Promotional poster
- Directed by: Seko Shamte
- Written by: Angela Ruhinda; Seko Shamte
- Story by: Maria Shoo
- Starring: Bertha Robert; Magdalena Munisi; Helen Hartmann; Godliver Gordian; Yann Sow; Alex Temu; Jonas Mugabe
- Cinematography: Justin Aguirre
- Edited by: Seko Shamte; Jeremy Weinstein
- Music by: Dara Taylor
- Production company: Black Unicorn Studios
- Distributed by: Okada Media Distribution
- Release date: 8 March 2021 (Pan African Film Festival)
- Running time: 95 minutes
- Country: Tanzania
- Languages: Swahili; English

Binti, is a 2021 Tanzanian drama film directed by Seko Shamte and co-produced by Shamte with Alinda Ruhinda and Angela Ruhinda. The film stars Bertha Robert, Magdalena Munisi, Helen Hartmann and Godliver Gordian. The film premiered on 8 March 2021 at the Pan African Film Festival in conjunction with International Women's Day. It is Tanzania's first Netflix film.

== Premise ==
The film revolves around four contemporary women characters in Dar es Salaam presented in four chapters: Tumaini, Angel, Stella and Rose.

== Cast ==
- Bertha Robert as Tumaini
- Magdalena Munisi as Angel
- Helen Hartmann as Stella
- Godliver Gordian as Rose
- Yann Sow as Emma
- Alex Temu as Ben
- Jonas Mugabe as James
- Hadija Athumani Saidi as Young Tumaini
- Hasham H. Hasham as Jeweler
- Jaffari Makatu as Young Baba Tumaini
- Levison Kulwa James as The Twins
- James Doto James as The Twins
- Betty Kazimbaya as Mama Tumaini
- Akbar Thabiti as Nelson
- Tiko Hassan as Tamala
- Tamala S. Kateka as Get Away Driver
- Francis Mpunga as Older Baba Tumaini
- Anatoly Shmakor as European Policeman
- Suleiman Mchora as Policeman
- Neema Wlele as Catherine
- Angel Henry George as Alinda
- Jane Masha as Doris
- Yasser Msellem as Omari
- Sauda Simba Kilumanga as Mama Angel
- Rita Paulsen as Doctor Ruhinda
- Hailath Maiko as Stella's Assistant
- Patricia David as Waitress
- Kyan Ishau as Chris
- Ruqahya Ramadhani as Irene
- Abubakar Amri as Rose's Assistant
- Chiku Seif as Fatima
- Regina Kihwewle as School Teacher
- Izack Lukindo as Doctor Shamte
- Abdallah Minyuma as Computer Technician
- Kiswiju Mpyanga as Mama Rose

== Production ==
Binti is the first Tanzanian film on Netflix. The film has been shot in and around Dar es Salaam, Tanzania. The color correction was done in India and Los Angeles, and the sound was done in Egypt. The premiere was delayed two years due to COVID-19 pandemic.

== Release ==
The film premiered on 8 March 2021 at the Pan African Film Festival in conjunction with International Women's Day and screened in several film festivals.

== Reception ==
Mrinal Mjaram of Cinema Express gave the film 3.5 stars out of 5 writing that it is "a powerful film about four women that shines an uncomfortable light on the deeply sexist society we live in". The EastAfrican described it as "a film about women by women".
