= Waithira (2018 film) =

2017 Kenyan-South African biographical documentary film

Waithira is a 2017 Kenyan–South African biographical documentary film directed by Eva Njoki Munyiri. The film explores the director's personal history and its intersections with Kenyan history, migration, and identity. It combines elements of memoir and documentary to examine themes of diaspora, memory, and family lineage.

== Plot ==
The film follows Eva Munyiri as she embarks on a journey to uncover the story of her paternal grandmother, also named Waithira. Having left Kenya at a young age and lived across multiple continents, Munyiri travels to Germany, Wales, and Kenya searching for her roots.

Along the way, she encounters other women in her family who share the name Waithira, including her sister and cousins, and pieces together a multigenerational narrative. The film also features the recollections of her elderly uncle, who provides insight into the family's history and ancestral land.

Through these interconnected stories, Waithira explores themes of displacement, migration, identity, and the silencing of women's voices, framing personal genealogy as a form of historical recovery.

== Cast ==
- Eva Munyiri
- Jimmy Kamau Waithira
- Benjamin Fernandez
- Lois Waithira Kamau
- Eric Seme Otero
- Kamau wa Munyiri
- Lois Waithira Wendrock

== Production ==
Waithira was written and directed by Eva Njoki Munyiri. It was co-produced by Munyiri, Stefan Gieren, and Jean Meeran under Team Tarbaby.

Cinematography was handled by Stefan Gieren, Vincent Mbaya, and Munyiri, while editing was completed by Javier Campos. The film has a running time of 72 minutes.

== Release and reception ==
Waithira premiered in 2017 and was screened at several international film festivals, including the Durban International Film Festival and Encounters South African International Documentary Festival. It was also featured at the Luxor African Film Festival and the Créteil International Women's Film Festival.

In 2018, the film screened at the Munich International Documentary Film Festival. It received positive critical attention for its personal and reflective storytelling approach.
