= Ngbra-Zongo =

Nigerian village

Ngbra-Zonga is a village in Plateau State, Nigeria. It is located about four miles away from the town of Miango in Bassa Local Government Area. The village has been subject to attacks by Muslim Fulani militants, most notably the attack in which Matthew Tagwi, a Christian pastor, was killed.

== Death of Pastor Matthew Tagwi ==
On 7 April 2020, radical Muslim Fulani militia armed with guns and machetes killed four people in Ngbra-Zonga, including a local pastor, Matthew Tagwi. According to the NGO Genocide Watch, the incident is one of a string of attacks that have left more than 20 Nigerian civilians shot or hacked to death by Muslim militants near Jos, the capital of Plateau State.
