= Beatrice Taisamo =

Tanzanian actress

- Born: Tanzania
- Occupation: Actress
- Known for: Fatuma (2018); Siri ya Mtungi (2012)

Beatrice Taisamo is a Tanzanian actress.

== Career ==
In the 2012 half-hour Swahili language TV Series, Siri ya Mtungi, made specially for Tanzania, she played the role of "Tula". Others featured include: Godliver Gordian and Yvonne Cherrie.

In another Swahili language film by Jordan Riber released in 2018 titled, Hadithi za Kumekucha: Fatuma, the main character, playing the role of "Fatuma". Also starred were Cathryn Credo and Ayoub Bombwe.

She was one of the eight African actresses nominated in the Best Actress in a Leading Actress category at the 2019 AMAA event, for her role in the film, Fatuma.

== Filmatography ==
Year	Film	Role	Notes	Ref.
2023	EONII	Actress	Sci-Fi	
2018	Bahasha	Nurse	Drama	
2018	Hadithi za Kumekucha: Fatuma	Actress (Fatuma)	Leading actress; Drama film	
2012	Siri ya Mtungi	Actress (Tula)	Short TV Series; Drama	

== Accolades ==
Year	Event	Prize	Recipient	Result
2019	AMAA	Best Actress in a Leading Role	Herself	Nominated
