= Make Room =

Make Room can stand for several things:

- "Make Room", a song by Helmet from Strap It On
- Make Room, a 1986 album by New Zealand musician Luke Hurley
- Make Room (album), 2018 album by Jonathan McReynolds
- Make Room! Make Room!, a dystopian science-fiction novel by Harry Harrison, the basis of the Soylent Green movie
- Makeroom, a 2018 Nigerian film

== See also ==
- "Make Room for Lisa", a 1999 episode of The Simpsons
