= Mickey Fonseca =

Mozambican director and producer

- Born: Mickey Fonseca; Maputo, Mozambique
- Occupation(s): Filmakeer, writer, producer
- Years active: 2005–present

Mickey Fonseca, is a Mozambican filmmaker, writer and producer. He is best known for directing the 2009 short film Mahla and 2019 crime thriller film Resgate. He is the founder of film production company Mahla Filmes.

== Personal life ==
Fonseca was born and raised in Maputo, Mozambique. At the age of 12, his passion towards cinema grew where he wrote letters to renowned filmmaker Steven Spielberg as well.

== Career ==
In his mid-twenties, Fonseca moved to Cape Town, South Africa and worked as a runner for Monkey Films. In 2006, he founded the film production company "Mahla Filmes" which is established in Maputo. Then for six years, the company shot commercials only.

In 2011, Fonseca attended 8-Week Screenwriting program at the New York Film Academy. Through the program, he was able to meet many Hollywood filmmakers and technical crew where Fonseca worked with them as the location manager and assistant manager in Africa for the blockbuster movies Diana and Blood Diamond. In 2009, he made his film debut by directing the short Traidos pela traição. Then he directed the short Mahla in the same year. The film became a turning point in his career, where the film received positive critics acclaim and nominated for best short at many film competitions: AMAA (Nigeria), TARIFA (Spain), Aguilar del Campoo (Spain), Festival Du Film D'Afrique et des Iles (Reunion Island) and XXX Festival Cinema Africano. (Verona, Italy).

After that success, he later produced two more short films under the banner of Mahla Filmes: The Letter and The Dowry and directed his third short Poisoned Love, all in the 2010. In 2018, he wrote, produced and directed his maiden feature film Resgate. At the African Movie Academy Awards (AMAA), the film won the Best Screenplay Award and Best Production Design as well as nominated for two other awards: Best Film and Best Director. Then at the Film Fest Zell, he won the Courageous Film Award for directing the film. In the same year, he was again nominated for the Young Talent Award for Best Feature Film at the Hamburg Film Festival. In 2020, the film became the first film from Lusophone: Portuguese-speaking Africa screened on Netflix.

== Filmography ==
Year	Film	Role	Genre	Ref.
2006	Blood Diamond	Third assistant director	Film	
2009	Traidos pela traição	Director, producer	Short film	
2009	Mahla	Director, producer, Writer	Short film	
2009	The Philanthropist	Assistant production manager	TV series	
2010	The Letter	Producer	Short film	
2010	The Dowry	Producer	Short film	
2010	Poisoned Love	Director, producer, Writer	Short film	
2010	Dina	Director, producer, Writer	Short film	
2012	Sean Banan inuti Seanfrika	Producer	Film	
2013	Diana	Location manager	Film	
2019	Resgate	Director, producer, Writer, Art director	Film	
2019	Mbuzini Memorial	Producer	Documentary short	
2020	Dear...	Production supervisor, Art director	TV series documentary	
