= Ellen: The Ellen Pakkies Story =

- Film poster
- Directed by: Daryne Joshua
- Written by: Amy Jephta
- Starring: Jill Levenberg; Jarrid Geduld; Elton Landrew
- Release date: 7 September 2018
- Running time: 123 minutes
- Country: South Africa
- Language: Afrikaans

Ellen: The Ellen Pakkies Story is a South African drama film, directed by Daryne Joshua. Based on true events, the film tells a story of the damaged relationship between a woman and her son, who is addicted to drug abuse. It also narrates the itinerary of events that led to the murder of her son, as well as the legal process that followed afterwards. It received multiple nominations at the 15th Africa Movie Academy Awards.

== Plot ==
The movie is based on the highly publicized 2007 case of Ellen Pakkies, a deeply religious and upstanding resident of Lavender Hill in Cape Town. For seven years, Ellen endured severe physical, emotional, and financial abuse from her 20-year-old son, Abie, who was severely addicted to methamphetamine (tik). After exhaustively seeking help from the police and social services to no avail, a desperate and exhausted Ellen made the tragic choice to strangle Abie to death with a rope.

In the subsequent landmark court case, the prosecution acknowledged the extreme structural failure and systemic neglect that drove her to the edge. Ellen was handed a three-year prison sentence, which was completely suspended for three years, alongside 280 hours of community service—allowing her to walk away a free woman.

== Cast ==
- Jill Levenberg as Ellen
- Jarrid Geduld as Abie
- Elton Landrew as Odneal
- Clint Brink as Adrian Samuels
- Ilse Klink as Magistrate Veronique van Deeman

== Production ==
Director Daryne Joshua initially didn't want to accept the role considering the sensitivity of the story. But after a personal encounter with Ellen Pakkies (the real person on whom the title character was based), he decided to go ahead with the project.

== Release ==
The film was released in South Africa on 7 September 2018.

== Reception ==
=== Critical reception ===
In his review, Peter Feldman for The Citizen praised the lead characters, as well as the script and production. Describing it as one of South Africa's best films in recent times, he gave it a 4/5 overall rating. Likewise, DRM.am gave it a four-star rating, with much of its praise going for the underlying message in the film. It read that the film "...is a constant reminder how easy it is to judge somebody without really knowing the reasons behind the facts." Giles Grifin for Life Righting Collective recounted from the theme of the film how the society have failed to adequately protect persons living with addicts or even the addict themselves. Daily Maverick suggested that the execution of the film was so special that it should be celebrated even outside of South Africa. It received a 8/10 excellent rating from Spling Movies, who applauded the "soundtrack, raw honesty and confessional drama" of the film. It also got acclaim for the social responsibility message, and was recommended as a model for other movies.

=== Accolades ===
The film was screened at Rotterdam international Film Festival, as well as Seattle International Film Festival. It won three awards including category for best actress, best actor and best scriptwriter at kykNET Silwerskerm Festival.
