= Mohcine Besri =

Moroccan actor and filmmaker

- Born: Mohcine Besri; 1971 (age 54–55); Meknes, Morocco
- Occupations: Actor; Writer; Producer; director
- Known for: Urgent (2018); Laaziza (2018); The Miscreants (Les mécréants) (2011)

Mohcine Besri (born 1971) is a Moroccan actor, writer, Producer and director.

== Career ==
In 2011, he wrote and directed the film, The Miscreants (French original title: Les mécréants), which he also produced alongside Michel Merkt, Michaël Rouzeau and Nicolas Wadimoff. The film starred Jamila El Haouini, Maria Lalouaz, Amine Ennaji, Abdenbi El Beniwi, Rabii Benjhaile and others. The film was reportedly released by the online streaming service Filmatigue around 2017.

In 2018, he directed the film, Urgent (French original title: Une urgence ordinaire), and screenplayed it with Cécile Vargaftig. It was produced by Elisa Garbar, Lamia Chraibi and Michel Merkt, and featured cast like Rachid Mustapha, Fatima Zahra Bennacer, Youssef Alaoui, Ayoub Layoussifi and others. The film was premiered in the 2018 Marrakech International Film Festival (MIFF) and in the 2019 Palm Springs International Film Festival and Tangier National Film Festival 2019. At the 15th Africa Movie Academy Awards (AMAA) in 2016, he was nominated in the "Best Director" award category for the film Urgent. The film also got about four other nominations.

Still in 2018, he wrote and directed the feature drama film titled, Laaziza. The film featured cast like Fatima Zahra Benacer, Omar Lotfi, Rachid Elouali and Zakaria Atifi. The film was reportedly screened at the 40th Cairo International Film Festival.

== Filmography ==
Year	Film	Role	Notes	Ref.
2018	Urgent (Une urgence ordinaire)	Director, writer	Drama	
2018	Laaziza	Director, writer	Drama	
2017	Worse Case, We Get Married	Actor (Mohammed)	Drama	
2011	The Miscreants (Les mécréants	Director, writer, Executive Producer	Drama	
2010	Opération Casablanca	Writer	Action, Comedy, Crime	
1995	Mary of Nazareth (Marie de Nazareth)	Actor (Jacques)	Drama	
1993	Abraham	2 Angel (2 episodes)	TV Mini Series, Adventure, biography, Drama	

== Accolades ==
Year	Event	Prize	Recipient	Result
2019	AMAA	Best Director – for Urgent	Himself	Nominated
