= Makeroom =

2018 Hausa feature film

- Directed by: Robert Peters
- Produced by: Rogers Ofime
- Starring: Yakubu Muhammed; Rekiya Attah; Sadi Sawaba; Usman Uzee; Asabe Madaki
- Release date: March 2018
- Country: Nigeria
- Language: Hausa
- Budget: ~ N200 - N300 million

Make Room is a Nigerian 2018 Hausa feature film showcasing the relationship between love and pursuit of dreams in the face of terrorism, directed by Robert Peters and produced by Rogers Ofime. The film features Kannywood actors and actresses such as Yakubu Muhammed, Sani Muazu, Rekiya Attah and Usman Uzee, supported by Adams Garba, Asabe Madake, Abba Zakky and Abubakar Maina.

== Plot ==
After being abducted along with 245 other girls from her school, the brilliant young Salma, the only child of her parents aged 17 and the others were made to live with the terrorists in their camp. This brought about a disturbance to her dreams but she, despite the present conditions, stayed true to her life's ambition. Goni, one of the insurgents, comes along her way and the two fall in love and soon get married. As life gets difficult, with the encroachment of death and sorrow, insurgents and the lovers soon part ways.

== Cast ==
- Asabe Madaki as Salma
- Sani Mu’azu as Salma's father
- Nadia Dutch as Dalia
- Uzee Usman
- Yakubu Muhammed
- Rekiya Attah
- Adams Garba
- Asabe Madake
- Abba Zakky
- Abubakar Maina
- Suji Jos
- Sadi Sawaba

== Production ==
The film which was based on the insurgent activities in Nigeria's Northeast featured about 3,000 day actors, 100 cast and 100 production crew members, and the shooting location was Ijebu - Miango, Bassa Local Government Area, Plateau State, Nigeria. The production took about 50 days to complete, costing an estimate of N200 to N300 million as production budget.

== Release ==
NMDb reported that the Hausa feature film was released in March 2018.

== Accolades ==
The film was nominated at the 15th Africa Movie Academy Awards in 2019. Among the nominations it received were:

Year	Event	Prize	Recipient	Result
2019	AMAA	Ousmane Sembene AMAA 2019 Award For Best Film in an African Language		Nominated
2019	AMAA	AMAA 2019 Award For Best Achievement in Make-Up		Nominated
2019	AMAA	AMAA 2019 Award For Best Achievement in Visual Effects		Nominated
2019	AMAA	AMAA 2019 Award For Best Achievement in Sound		Nominated
2019	AMAA	AMAA 2019/National Film and Video Censors Board (NFVCB) Award For Best Nigerian Film		Nominated
