= Jordan Riber =

Tanzanian filmmaker and sound engineer

- Born: Harare, Zimbabwe
- Occupations: Director; screenwriter; producer; film editor; sound engineer
- Years active: 2005–present
- Website: jordanriber.com

Jordan Riber is a filmmaker known for his films Siri ya Mtungi (2012), Bahasha (2018) and Fatuma (2018).

== Early life and education ==
Riber was born to filmmakers John and Louise Riber. He grew up in Harare, Zimbabwe. His childhood was influenced by his parents' film career and he attended Fairhaven College until his graduation in 2004. Since 2005, he had been a practicing filmmaker and sound engineer in Dar es Salaam, Tanzania.

== Career ==
In 2012, Riber was the editor and director of Siri ya Mtungi. In 2017, he directed Hadithi za Kumekucha: Tunu, and in 2018, Fatuma. In the same year, he directed and produced Bahasha. The 2018 Zanzibar International Film Festival selected Riber's Bahasha as the opening film of the festival, which together with Fatuma were placed in the Long Features category. Rider was also awarded the Best Director and Best Cinematography.

== Filmography ==
- The Cost of Love (2007)
- Mwamba Ngoma (2009)
- Chumo (2011)
- Siri ya Mtungi (2012)
- Tunu: The Gift (2017)
- Bahasha (2018)
- Fatuma (2018)
- West Shore (2024)

== Accolades ==
Year	Event	Prize	Recipient	Result	Ref.
2014	Africa Magic Viewers' Choice Awards	Best Television Series - Comedy/drama	Jordan Riber	Nominated	
2014	Africa Magic Viewers' Choice Awards	Best Indigenous Language Movie/Series Swahili	Jordan Riber	Nominated	
2014	Africa Magic Viewers' Choice Awards	Best Sound Editor	Jordan Riber	Nominated	
2018	Zanzibar International Film Festival	Best Director	Jordan Riber	Won	
2018	Zanzibar International Film Festival	Best Cinematography	Jordan Riber	Won	
