= The Burial of Kojo =

2018 drama film

- Theatrical release poster
- Directed by: Blitz Bazawule
- Written by: Blitz Bazawule
- Produced by: Blitz Bazawule; Ama K. Abebrese; Kwaku Obeng Boateng
- Starring: Cynthia Dankwa; Ama K. Abebrese; Joseph Otsiman; Mamley Djangmah; Kobina Amissah-Sam; Henry Adofo; Joyce Anima Misa Amoah; Brian Angels; Joe Addo; Emanuel Nerttey; Edward Dankwa; Zalfa Odonkor
- Cinematography: Michael Fernandez
- Edited by: Kwaku Obeng Boateng
- Music by: Blitz Bazawule
- Production companies: Wheel Barrow Productions; Africa Film Society
- Distributed by: ARRAY; Netflix
- Release dates: 21 September 2018 (New York); 31 March 2019
- Running time: 80 minutes
- Country: Ghana
- Languages: Twi (Akan Kasa); English

The Burial of Kojo is a 2018 Ghanaian drama film written, composed and directed by Blitz Bazawule. Produced by Bazawule, Ama K. Abebrese and Kwaku Obeng Boateng, it was filmed entirely in Ghana on a micro-budget, with local crew and several first-time actors. The film tells the story of Kojo, who is left to die in an abandoned gold mine, as his young daughter Esi travels through a spirit land to save him.

It had its world premiere in New York on 21 September 2018, at the Urban World Film Festival, where it was recognized as Best Narrative Feature (World Cinema). The film received nine nominations at the 15th Africa Movie Academy Awards and won two, including Best First Feature Film by a Director. It is distributed by ARRAY and was released on streaming service Netflix on 31 March 2019, making it the first Ghanaian film to premiere in selected countries worldwide, on Netflix.

== Plot ==
Esi recounts her childhood in rural Ghana, where she lives in a village in a lake similar to the real-life village, Nzulezo, built on stilts, with her father Kojo and her mother Ama, who supplies most of the family's small income through sewing. Kojo grew up in a large city but fled to the village after a tragic event, feeling that "only water could cleanse the past." Esi is close to her father, who takes her around the lake in his boat and tells her stories whose beginnings only make sense if you know their endings. An unexpected visitor — an old blind man from "the realm in-between" where "everything is upside down" — arrives in the village and entrusts Esi with a sacred white bird that he says is being hunted by the crow who rules the land in-between.

Soon thereafter, the family receives another unexpected visitor — Esi's uncle Kwabena, from whom Kojo has been estranged. Kwabena persuades Kojo to bring his family to the city from which Kojo had fled seven years before. There, they live with Esi's grandmother, with whom Esi watches a Spanish-language Mexican telenovela featuring a conflict between two brothers who love the same woman. It transpires that Kojo and Kwabena had also once loved the same woman, who had died on the day of her wedding to Kwabena due to Kojo driving drunk. Kwabena, however, says that the past is the past, and wants Kojo to join him in illegal small-scale gold mining to make money. Initially reluctant, Kojo is finally persuaded, and goes with his brother to an old mine on property now owned by a Chinese company. Without warning, Kwabena pushes Kojo into an abandoned mineshaft and runs away. Esi and Ama go to the police to report Kojo missing. Esi continues to have visions of the "crow who ruled the land in-between." She realizes that the crow is her uncle Kwabena, who also died in the drunk driving crash seven years before, and the sacred white bird is her father, and that only she can find him.

== Cast ==
- Cynthia Dankwa as Esi
- Ama K. Abebrese as Older Esi (narrator)
- Joseph Otsiman as Kojo, Esi's father
- Mamley Djangmah as Ama, Esi's mother
- Kobina Amissah-Sam as Kwabena, Kojo's brother
- Henry Adofo as Apalu
- Joyce Anima Misa Amoah as Nana, Esi's grandmother
- Brian Angels as Sergeant Asare
- Joe Addo as Detective Koomson
- Emanuel Nerttey as Young Kojo
- Edward Dankwa as Young Kwabena
- Zalfa Odonkor as Adwoa

== Reception ==
=== Critical reception ===
The film has received favorable reviews from critics. On the review aggregator website, Rotten Tomatoes, the film holds an approval rating of 100% based on 15 reviews, with an average of 9.3/10. Metacritic assigned the film a weighted average score of 93 out of 100, based on 5 critics, indicating "universal acclaim".

Richard Brody of The New Yorker wrote, "Bazawule offers a portrait of a dawning artist that catches the early flame of artistic inspiration from within." John DeFore of The Hollywood Reporter wrote, "Viewers may worry that Bazawule's starkly gorgeous pictures aren't going to add up to anything, but Burial satisfies in prosaic as well as poetic terms, supplying an end that makes sense of its beginning. It will leave many who see it eager for the young filmmaker's next fable." Brian Costello of Common Sense Media wrote, "This is a lush and beautiful film, filled with dazzling images drawn as much from magical realism as from the setting itself."

=== Awards ===
Year	Ceremony	Category	Nominated work	Result	Notes
2018	Urbanworld Film Festival	Best Narrative Feature (World Cinema)	The Burial of Kojo	Won	
2019	Luxor African Film Festival	Best Narrative Feature	The Burial of Kojo	Won	
2019	Africa Movie Academy Awards	Achievement in Cinematography	The Burial of Kojo	Nominated	
2019	Africa Movie Academy Awards	Achievement in Production Design	The Burial of Kojo	Nominated	
2019	Africa Movie Academy Awards	Achievement in Editing	The Burial of Kojo	Nominated	
2019	Africa Movie Academy Awards	Best Visual Effects	The Burial of Kojo	Nominated	
2019	Africa Movie Academy Awards	Achievement in Makeup	The Burial of Kojo	Nominated	
2019	Africa Movie Academy Awards	Best Sound	The Burial of Kojo	Nominated	
2019	Africa Movie Academy Awards	Best First Feature Film by a Director	Blitz Bazawule	Won	
2019	Africa Movie Academy Awards	Best Actor in a Leading Role	Joseph Otsiman	Nominated	
2019	Africa Movie Academy Awards	Best Actor in a Supporting Role	Kobina Amissah-Sam	Nominated	
2019	Africa Movie Academy Awards	Most Promising Actor	Cynthia Dankwa	Won	
