= No Gold for Kalsaka =

2019 documentary film

- Film poster
- Directed by: Michel K. Zongo
- Written by: Michel K. Zongo
- Produced by: Michel K. Zongo; Florian Schewe
- Cinematography: Michel K. Zongo
- Edited by: François Sculier; Moumouni Jupiter Sodré
- Music by: Moumouni Jupiter Sodré
- Distributed by: Rushlake Media
- Release date: 24 February 2019
- Running time: 80 minutes
- Countries: Burkina Faso; Germany
- Languages: French; Mooré
- Budget: €30,000

No Gold for Kalsaka (French: Pas d'or pour Kalsaka) is a 2019 Burkinabe documentary film written and directed by Michel K. Zongo and co-produced with Florian Schewe.

== Synopsis ==
Since a long time ago, in the African country of Burkina Faso, the people of the small village of Kalsaka had mined and used gold for their economic sustenance. With the coming of a British multinational mining corporation, however, that was brought to a close as the people were zoned out completely of the mining benefits from their own land. The village commune, nevertheless, led by Jean-Baptiste, fights hard to take back what belongs to the locals.

== Production ==
The filming was done in the Yatenga Province of Burkina Faso. It was produced by Michel K. Zongo for Diam Production [bf] and Florian Schewe for Film Five GmbH.

== Accolades ==
The film got a nomination for the Best Documentary category in the 2019 Africa Movie Academy Awards.

== Release ==
The film was released on February 24, 2019.

== Reception ==
On November 15, 2019, in collaboration with the Montreal International Documentary Festival (RIDM), the film was premiered by Cinema Politica Concordia in Quebec. The film was billed as one of the films changing the world and was scheduled to be premiered in the Czech Republic in Autumn 2020 by One World.
