= Fatima Zahra Bennacer =

Moroccan actress

- Born: 30 October 1981 (age 44)
- Occupation: Actress
- Years active: 1997 - till present
- Notable work: Urgent

Fatima Zahra Bennacer (Arabic : فاطمة الزهراء بناصر; born 30 October 1981), is a Moroccan actress. She began her career in 1997 and has featured in many productions. She became famous for her role in the TV series "An hour in hell" as Sophia, and her role as the rebellious girl in the Ramadan TV series Okba Lik.

== Acting Credits ==
=== Cinema ===
Year	Title	Director
2003	Raja	Jacques Doillon
2007	Nancy and The Monster	Mahmoud Frites
2010	Pegase	Mohamed Mouftakir
2011	The Rif Lover	Narjiss Nejjar
2012	Anger	Mohamed Zineddaine
2013	The Gun	Raouf Sebbahi
2013	The Red Moon	Hassan Benjelloun
2013	Pillow Secrets	Jillali Ferhati
2014	Formatage	Mourad El Khaoudi
2016	Tikitat-A-Soulima	Ayoub Layoussifi
2016	Tears of Satan	Hicham El Jebbari
2017	Sweat Rain	Hakim Belabbas
2018	Urgent	Mohcine Besri
2018	The Doors of the Sky	Mourad El Khaoudi
2018	Laaziza	Mohcine Besri
2019	Moroccan Robbery	Ahmed Tahiri Idrissi
2021	Lost	Driss Roukhe
2022	Polygamous	Zakaria Zahrani

=== Television ===
Year	Title	Notes
2003	Amoud	Fantasy miniseries : 15 episodes
2005	Tariq Sahih	Television film
2005-2007	Romana w Brtal	Historical Series : 26 epidoes
2008	Hjar El Wad	Television film
2008	Une heure en enfer	Anthology Series : Various Characters
2009	Okba lik	Television film
2009	Masshouk Shaytan	Television film
2009	Karyan Zombie	Television film
2010	Okba lik (The series)	Comedy series : 30 episodes
2011	Hamra w Khadra	Television film
2011	Al Korsan Al Abyad	Television film
2011	Salon Shahrazad	Drama series : 30 episodes
2011	The Five Seasons	Television film
2011	Dilal Al Mawt	Television film
2011	Mawja Kassira	Television film
2014	Sada Al Joudran	Drama series :30 episodes
2014	Al Diab La Tanam	Television film
2015	Without Family	Drama series : 30 episodes
2015	Hmimou	Drama Miniseries : 4 episodes
2015	Hors Jeu	Television film
2015	Al Shawt Tani	Television film
2015	Tarikhouna Fakhrouna	Historical Anthology Series : 4 episodes
2016	Dar Dmana	Historical Drama : 30 episodes
2017	Ali Ya Ali	Television film
2017	Hdidan Fi Gueliz	Comedy series : 30 episodes
2018	Qoloub Taeha	Drama series : 30 episodes
2018	Azz Al Madina	Drama series : 30 episodes
2018	Wara'a Al Mir'at	Television film
2018	Assafha Al Oula	Drama miniseries : 4 episodes
2018	Victim Number 8	Episode 6
2019	Qasser El Basha	Drama series : 15 episodes
2019	Taxi 2.0	Comedy Miniseries : 4 episodes
2020	Oud Al Basbas	Television film
2020	Oulad El Moukhtar	Drama series : 30 episodes
2020	Al Ghariba	Drama series : 30 episodes
2021	Al Madi La Yamout	Drama series : 30 episodes
2021	Countdown	Television film
2021	Ahlam City	Sitcom : 30 epidoes
2022	Tazawwaj Ma Qalha Liyya	Comedy series : 15 episodes
2022	Biya Wla Bik	Drama series : 30episodes
2022	Jourouh	Drama series : 15 episodes
2023	Aicha	Drama series : 15 episodes

== Discography ==
- (ar) Hamam lkhla (حمام لخلا)
- (ar) Goliya (قوليا)
- (ar) Kif nessma (كيف نسمة)
- (ar) Liyam (ليام)
- (ar) baa m3aya (بقا معيا)
- (ar) zahwiya (زاهوية)
- (ar) Maktouaa mn chajra (مقطوع من شجرة)
