= Eva Njoki Munyiri =

- Citizenship: Kenyan
- Occupations: Documentary filmmaker and producer
- Known for: Waithira
- Notable work: Bank Slave

Eva Njoki Munyiri is a Kenyan documentary filmmaker and producer based in Mexico City. Well known for the film Waithira, she is also the founder of Curious Kid, a Kenyan based production house.

Eva left Kenya at the age 14 and has lived in 3 continents since then. Her first film was in competition in the Durban International Film Festival in 2017. Her other film, Bank Slave, also won the France 24RFI prize in 2012.

== Career ==
Eva Njoki Munyiri has worked as a researcher, producer and curator in South Africa, France and Mexico.

In 2012, Eva Njoki filmed the documentary Bankslave which won the Visa pour l’Image Festival Perpignan.

In 2017 Eva Njoki collaborated with Chimurenga to bring the radio station Pan African Space Station (PASS) to the Tamayo Museum in Mexico City. Tamayo Museum is one of Mexico City's leading public contemporary art museums.

In 2017 Eva Njoki Munyiri produced the documentary, Waithira. Waithira is a documentary about the life of Eva Njoki Munyiri as she searches for information about her paternal grandmother. The filmmaker discovers untold family histories. Waithira has gone on to receive international acclaim. It has been screened at festivals such as South Africa's DIFF & Encounters, Luxor African Film Festival, Festival Film de Femmes and more.

In 2020, A Bomb for Pan Africa, was among the 31 selected films to pitch at Durban FilmMart’s Finance Forum.

Eva Njoki Munyiri founded Curious Kid a Kenyan based production house.

== Filmography ==
Documentary

- Waithira (2017)
- Bankslave (2013)

Short Film

- Liquid

Director

- A Bomb for Pan Africa (2020)

== Awards ==
| Year | Award | Work | Category | Results |
|---|---|---|---|---|
| 2012 | Visa pour l’Image Festival Perpignan | Bankslave | France24/RFI | Won |
| 2017 | DIFF & Encounters | Waithira | Long Documentary | Nominated |
| 2018 | Luxor African Film Festival | Waithira | Long Documentary | Won |
| 2018 | Festival Film de Femmes | Waithira | Long Documentary | Nominated |
| 2018 | Dokfest Munich | Waithira | Long Documentary | Nominated |
| 2018 | AFI | Waithira | Long Documentary | Nominated |
