= Secrets of an African Pot =

- Also known as: Secrets of an African Pot
- Written by: JHUCP in partnership with MDIF
- Story by: JHUCP in partnership with MDIF
- Directed by: Rita Wachera
- Starring: Juma Rajab; Beatrice Taisamo; Nkwabi Elias Ng'angasamala; Hidaya Maeda; Daudi Michael; McDonald Haule; Yvonne Cherrie; Godliver Gordian
- Country of origin: Tanzania
- Original languages: Swahili; English; French; Portuguese

Production
- Producers: John Riber and Louise Riber

Original release
- Release: 2012 – 2012

Siri ya Mtungi also known as (Secrets of the African Pot) is a Tanzanian television-series. It was first aired in 2012.

The main-theme of Siri ya Mtungi was to educate and deliver more awareness about HIV/AIDS prevention, Family planning, Maternal and child health.

Siri ya Mtungi originally recorded in Swahili is also dubbed in English, French and Portuguese as a way to reach a bigger audience.

== Production ==
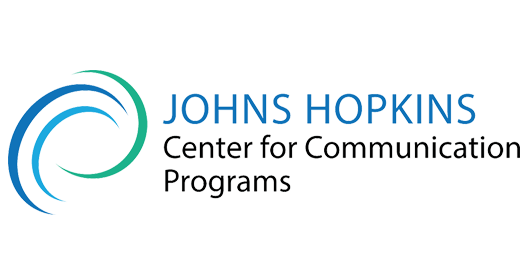
Johns Hopkins Bloomberg School of Public Health Center for Communications Programs

The series was directed by Media For Development International (MFDI), and created by The Johns Hopkins Bloomberg School of Public Health Center for Communication Programs (JHU.CCP), in partnership with MFDI . The series received funding for production from, USAID (The United States Agency for International Development) and PEPFAR. Siri ya Mtungi was produced by CCP's Tanzania Capacity and Communication Project (TCCP).

USAID logo

== Plot ==
Cheche a family man is given a Photography Studio for commercial purposes as gift by a man named Habibu. The late Habibu is known to be as the photography guru and the best in business. Cheche's relationship with his family gets complicated as he begins his career in photography. He became the center of attention as his community views his new-life as an ideal one and exemplary. He captures the soul of the community on its journey to dreams, hopes and personal crises in his unique portraits of families, friends and personal portraits. He starts being unfaithful to his wife as he started having affairs multiple partners (Women) including his teenage sweetheart Tula.

On the other hand Mzee kizito is seen to lead a peaceful life with his two wives and seventeen children. He runs a successful motor garage business that supports him and his family. Trouble begins as he is about to marry a fourth wife.

Nusura is a girlfriend of Duma a player and a criminal, and the daughter of Masharubu who is famously known as the Slum-lord. Nusura is against of Duma's criminal actions and hedonistic lifestyle, but worst happens when Duma gets into trouble with her father the slum-lord Masharubu.

== Cast ==
- Juma Rajab as Cheche
- Beatrice Taisamo as Tula
- Nkwabi Elias Ng'angasamala as Mzee Kizito
- Hidaya Maeda as Nusura
- Daudi Micheal as Duma
- MacDonald Haule as Masharubu
- Yvonne Cherry as Lulu
- Godliver Gordian as Cheusi
- Betty Kazimbaya as Mwanaidi
- Patrick Masele as Dafu
- Halima Maulid as Farida
- Seif Mbembe as Mawazo
- Yaeli Mpila as Steven
- Khalidi Nyanza as Kovu
- Suleimani Suleiman as Shoti
