= Rita Paulsen =

Tanzanian television personality (born 1977)

- Born: 26 February 1977 (age 49); Tanzania
- Other name: Madame Rita
- Occupations: Talent manager; creative consultant; television director
- Title: Owner and Director of Benchmark Productions

Rita Paulsen (born 26 February 1977) is a Tanzanian television personality, philanthropist, entrepreneur, and the founder and chief executive officer of Benchmark Productions, which produces the Tanzanian television talent show Bongo Star Search.

== Early life ==
Paulsen initially wanted to become a lawyer. However, she became pregnant at 14 and was consequently ostracized from her community. She later shared her experiences to encourage young girls facing similar challenges.

== Career ==
Paulsen is the founder and CEO of the television production company Benchmark Productions, which produces the television show Bongo Star Search. While developing the show, Paulsen was inspired by American Idol. As with the American original, the show is a singing competition that aims to find and promote singing talents, especially young ones.

She also hosts a 45-minute namesake television show, Rita Paulsen Show.
