= Jill Levenberg =

South African actress (born 1977)

- Born: 20 September 1977 (age 48)
- Education: University of Cape Town
- Occupation: Actress
- Notable work: Ellen: The Ellen Pakkies Story

Jill Levenberg (born 20 September 1977) is a South African actress. In 2018, she starred in Ellen: The Ellen Pakkies Story as the title character, a role that earned her a nomination and two awards including a South African Film and Television Award for Best Actress in a Feature Film.

== Biography ==
Levenberg was raised in Kensington, Cape Town. At the age of six, Levenberg made her debut on stage, singing at the Kensington Civic Center. She performed in plays and sang in the choir throughout primary school. Levenberg attended the University of Cape Town. Despite considering quitting during her second year, she graduated with a Bachelor of Arts in Theatre & Performance and English Literature. Levenberg performed in several plays in her early career, including Medea, Blood Brothers and Orpheus in Africa, receiving a Fleur du Cap Theatre Award for Best Supporting Actress in a Musical for the last role.

Levenberg played Beulah in the 2015 film Abraham. Beginning in 2015, she has portrayed Mymoena Samsodien in the long-running TV series Suidooster. In 2020, Levenberg suggested that the show explore a polygamy storyline, so her on-screen husband AB (Cedwyn Joel) took a second wife, Farah (Lee-Ann van Rooi).

In 2018, Levenberg landed the role of Ellen Pakkies in Ellen: The Ellen Pakkies Story, her first starring role in a film. The story deals with Ellen's struggles with her drug-addicted son, and is based on a true story. Levenberg first began following the story in 2007, and rather than judging her, understood where she was coming from due to the drug problem in Cape Town. Levenber first heard about the role in 2015, and auditioned for any part in the film but was initially decline. However, in 2017 director Daryne Joshua contacted her and told her he wanted her for the leading role. In order to prepare for the role, she moved into a small place near the sea and did a lot of research on dissociation and places in Cape Town. Levenberg also befriended Pakkies, who told her she was a quiet person throughout her life, forcing Levenberg to change her performance. The film premiered at the Silwerskerm Film Festival and she received the Best Actress award. Levenber was also nominated for Best Actress in a Leading Role at the 2019 Africa Movie Academy Awards.

Levenberg is vocal in her opposition to film piracy. She supported the Performer’s Protection Act. Levenberg gives free yoga and drama classes to at-risk youth in Cape Town. She speaks English, Afrikaans, and German fluently.

== Partial filmography ==
- 2015: A Whistle Blows/Fluit-Fluit (as Gwen Isaacs)
- 2015: While You Weren't Looking (as Yasmin)
- 2015: Uitvlucht (as San)
- 2015: Abraham (as Beulah)
- 2015–present: Suidooster (TV series, as Mymoena Samsodien)
- 2018: Ellen: The Ellen Pakkies Story (as Ellen)

== Awards and nominations ==
| Year | Association | Category | Work | Result | Ref |
|---|---|---|---|---|---|
| ? | Fleur du Cap Theatre Award | Best Supporting Actress in a Musical | Orpheus in Africa | Won | |
| 2018 | Silwerskerm Film Festival | Best Actress | Ellen: The Ellen Pakkies Story | Won | |
| 2019 | South African Film and Television Awards | Best Actress – Feature Film | Ellen: The Ellen Pakkies Story | Won | |
| 2019 | Africa Movie Academy Awards | Best Actress in a Leading Role | Ellen: The Ellen Pakkies Story | Nominated | |
