= Bahasha =

2018 Tanzania drama film

Bahasha (film)
- Directed by: Jordan Riber
- Screenplay by: Andrew Whaley
- Produced by: Louise Kamin; John Riber; Jordan Riber; Louise Riber
- Starring: Ayoub Bombwe; Cathryn Credo; Godliver Gordian
- Cinematography: Talib Rasmussen
- Edited by: Jordan Riber & Louise Riber
- Release date: July 2018
- Running time: 1h 25m
- Country: Tanzania
- Language: Swahili

Bahasha (film) is a 2018 Tanzanian movie about a public official who seeks redemption after taking bribe. It battles the issue of corruption in our present society.

The film was nominated at Africa Movie Academy Award for Best Film In African Language in 2018.

== Synopsis ==
Kitasa had to give up on his dream to be a professional footballer due to an injury. He gets elected by his community as a public officer but soon engages in a corrupt activity disappointing himself and those around him. The movie shows how he deals with the consequences of his actions and his struggle to redeem himself. Can he?

== Cast ==
- Ayoub Bombwe as Kitasa
- Cathryn Credo as Hidaya
- Godliver Gordian as Zawadi
- Anita Abisai as Grace Pindi
- Andrew Ashima as Raphael
- Grace Essau as Paka
- MacDonald Haule as Butu
- Hassan Kazoa as Faraji
- Omary Khatibu as Maganga
- Lilian Matin as Shani
- Hamidu Mapitu as Faustin
