= Jahmil X. T. Qubeka =

South African film director (born 1979)

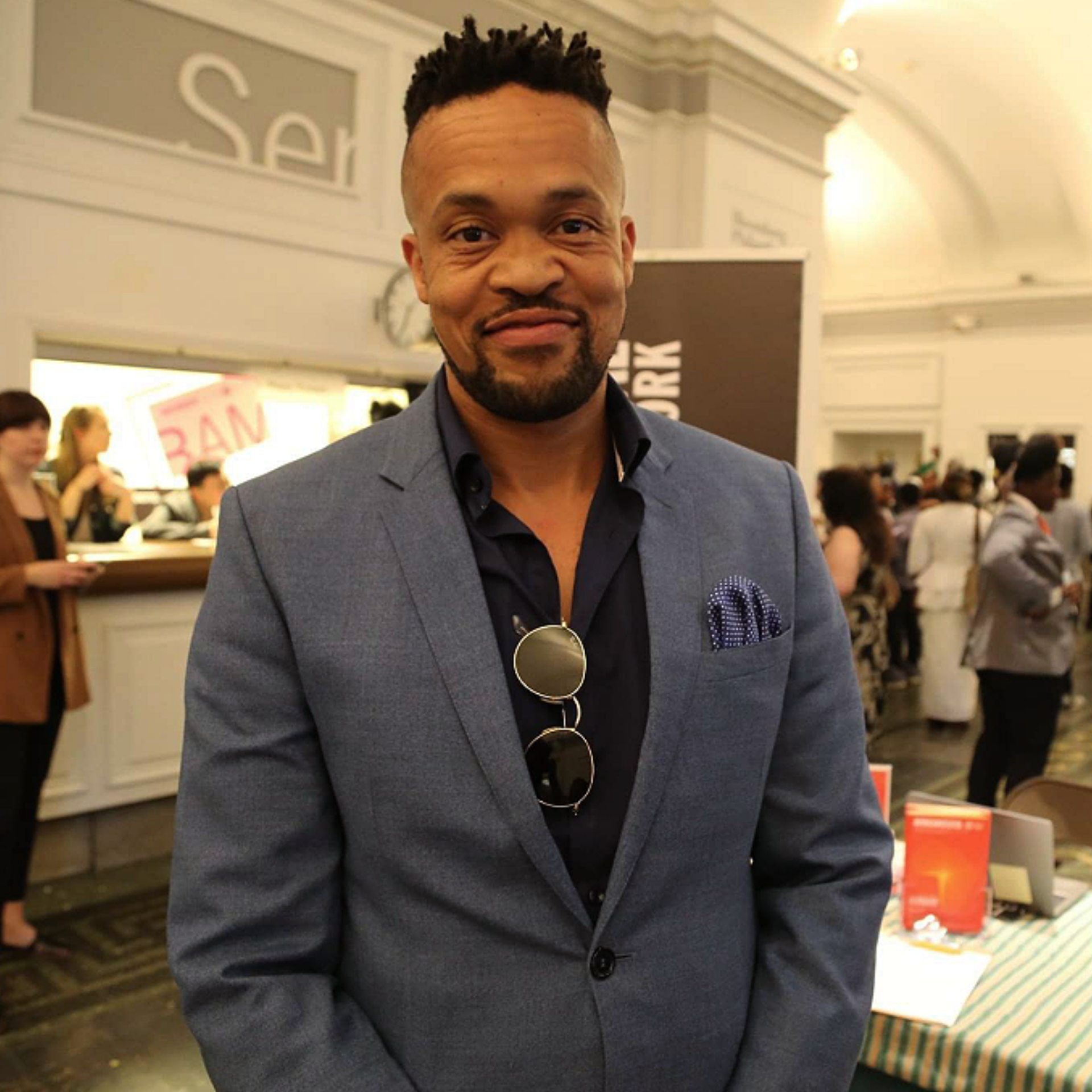
- Qubeka at the 2019 African Films Festival
- Born: Xolani Thandikaya Qubeka; 26 March 1979 (age 47); Mdantsane, Ciskei
- Occupations: Film director, screenwriter, producer
- Years active: 2000–present

Xolani Thandikaya Qubeka (born 26 March 1979), professionally known as Jahmil X. T. Qubeka, is a South African film director, screenwriter, and producer.

He has mostly worked on action, crime, and drama films that tell the story of post-apartheid South Africa, and has received multiple accolades, including Best Director at the 15th edition of the Africa Movie Academy Awards for Sew the Winter to My Skin.

== Personal life ==
Qubeka was born in a Xhosa family in what used to be the nominally independent state of Ciskei. Although he was born during the apartheid era, he grew up in a relatively elite Black neighborhood, and stated that he "doesn’t have the weight of apartheid on his shoulders." He describes his father as a cinephile who constantly watched movies.

He states that Stanley Kubrick and Fritz Lang are among his biggest cinematic influences, but that he also enjoys comedy and is a huge fan of American comedian Eddie Murphy. He also stated that the 1982 Murphy-starring 48 Hrs. is one of his favorite films.

== Cinematic career ==
Qubeka's 2013 film Of Good Report was originally chosen to open the Durban International Film Festival, but was announced that it was banned by the National Film and Video Foundation of South Africa for containing an "unethical" romance between a teacher and a student, constituting what the board said was "child pornography". This decision was later overturned after an appeal by the producers of the film. Of Good Report later won the 2014 Africa Movie Academy Award for Best Film.

He won the award for Best Director for his action thriller Sew the Winter to My Skin at the 15th Africa Movie Academy Awards that were held in Lagos, Nigeria.

Speaking on his 2019 film Knuckle City, Qubeka stated that he looked forward to mixing genres on his future film projects, and also spoke about the "toxic masculinity" that exists in South African culture.

In 2022, Qubeka released two television series. His epic fantasy series Blood Psalms launched on Showmax in September and billed as its biggest and most ambitious production to date. It stars South African actress Thando Thabethe, Sello Maake Ka Ncube and Warren Masemola, and tells the story of an African queen battling a world-ending prophecy to navigate her people through politics and never-ending wars. In November, his Kings of Queenstown, a Netflix original series about a young soccer prodigy, was released. As of November 2022, he is in pre-production on the supernatural thriller The White Devil, based on a book by the same name.

== Reception ==
Guy Lodge for Variety praised Qubeka's unique attempts of telling post-apartheid South Africa's story in film making that is not solely based on racial segregation, but violence and patriarchal sexuality. The adoption of black and white sequence of images, as opposed to colored, was also highlighted as adding a positive uniqueness to the film Of Good Report. He summarized its review by stating, "Jahmil X.T. Qubeka's striking but grisly feature swerves wildly from obsessive student-teacher romance into splattering horror."

== Personal life ==
Jahmil has two children. He is currently in a partnership with fellow yellow-bone founder, Layla Swart.

== Filmography ==
- 2006: Shogun Khumalo Is Dying! (short)
- 2010: A Small Town Called Descent
- 2013: Of Good Report
- 2018: Sew the Winter to My Skin
- 2019: Knuckle City
- 2022: You're My Favourite Place
- 2022: Blood Psalms
- 2023: The Queenstown Kings
