= Joseph Otsiman =

Ghanaian actor

Joseph otsiman
- Born: 1989 (age 36–37); Sekondi-Takoradi
- Other name: Otsiman
- Citizenship: Ghana
- Education: Takoradi senior high school
- Occupation: Actor
- Years active: 2006
- Awards: African movie Academy award

Joseph Otsiman is a New York-based Ghanaian actor, noted for his role as Pastor John Moses in The Cursed Ones and Kojo in The Burial of Kojo. He is a two-time Africa Movie Academy Awards nominee.

== Career ==
Otsiman played the title character, Kojo Bonsu in The Burial of Kojo, directed by Blitz the Ambassador.

He was nominated for Best Actor in a Supporting Role at the 2016 AMA Awards and Best actor in a Leading Role at the 2019 Africa Movie Academy Awards.

== Filmography ==
- The Cursed Ones (2015) as Pastor John Moses
- Keteke (2017) as Young Man
- The Burial of Kojo (2018) as Kojo
