= Nine Nights =

2018 United Kingdom drama film

- Film poster
- Directed by: Veronica McKenzie
- Written by: Veronica McKenzie
- Produced by: Veronica McKenzie
- Starring: Malcolm Atobrah; Elizabeth Brace; Deborah Colphon
- Cinematography: Rick Stanton
- Edited by: Liz Webber
- Music by: Arhynn Descy
- Release date: 2018
- Running time: 99 minutes
- Country: United Kingdom
- Language: English

Nine Nights is a film produced and written by Veronica McKenzie. It mainly revolves around the mourning which takes place for a dead child who is a twin and the other twin refusing to let go. The story is based on the mourning rituals which has to take place for nine nights and how family secrets gets revealed.

The movie won an award at PAFF Directors' Award in 2019.

== Synopsis ==
When her twin brother is hit by a car and killed, Marcie refuses to believe that he is dead and is adamant he’s still alive. The family begins the Caribbean mourning ritual ‘Nine Night’ designed to let the dead go. As the nights count down, Marcie comes face-to-face with her brother and her descent into paranoia, unleashes long-buried family secrets.

== Cast ==
- Malcolm Atobrah: Michael Haines
- Elizabeth Brace: Tina Ramadin
- Deborah Colphon: Miss May
- Paulette Harris-German: Sister P
- Jo Martin: Leonore Haines
- T'Nia Miller: Sylvie Johnson
- Mary Nyambura: Marcie Haines
- Premila Puri: Nurse Sandra
- Mark Redguard: Pastor Douglas
- Rizwan Shebani: Paul Jenner
