= Joyce Anima Misa Amoah =

Ghanaian actress

Joyce Anima Misah Amoah
- Citizenship: Ghanaian
- Occupations: Actress; Playwright; Director
- Known for: Love Brewed in African Pot, Heritage Africa, Adams Apple, The burial of Kojo

Joyce Anima Misa Amoah is a Ghanaian actress, playwright and a director.

== Career ==
She is a BBC award-winning playwright. She played a role in Kwaw Ansah’s ‘Love Brewed In African Pot’ and ‘Heritage Africa, Adams Apples and co directed "Wogbɛ Jɛkɛ" stage play. She played Nana in The Burial of Kojo. She is the General Manager of the media and arts company, Sapphire Ghana.
