= Lara and the Beat =

2018 Nigerian film

- Theatrical release poster
- Directed by: Tosin Coker
- Screenplay by: John Arthur-Ingram; Kay I. Jegede; Pearl Osibu
- Produced by: Tolu Olusoga; Tosin Coker
- Starring: Seyi Shay; Vector; Somkele Iyamah; Wale Ojo; Sharon Ooja; Shaffy Bello
- Cinematography: Harold Escotet
- Edited by: James Kwon Lee; Edgard Leroy
- Music by: Benjamin Young
- Production companies: Biola Alabi Media; Skylar Pictures LLC
- Distributed by: FilmOne Distributions
- Release date: July 20, 2018
- Running time: 137 minutes
- Country: Nigeria
- Languages: English; Yoruba
- Box office: ₦31 million

Lara and the Beat is a 2018 Nigerian drama film, directed by Tosin Coker, starring Seyi Shay, Vector, Somkele Iyamah, Wale Ojo, Sharon Ooja, Shaffy Bello and Uche Jombo. The film premiered on 8 July 2018.

== Plot ==
Lara and the Beat is a coming of age story about the beautiful Giwa Sisters who are caught in the center of a financial scandal with their late parents' media empire. The sisters are forced out of their privileged bubble and must learn to build their own future and salvage their family's legacy through music and enterprise.

== Cast ==
- Seyi Shay as Lara Giwa
- Somkele Iyamah as Dara Giwa
- Vector as Sal Gomez (Mr Beats)
- Chioma Chukwuka as Aunty Patience
- Uche Jombo as Fadekemi West
- Sharon Ooja as Ngozi
- Shafy Bello as Jide's Mum
- Saheed Balogun as Board Chairman
- Kemi Lala Akindoju as Tonye
- Ademola Adedoyin as Wale Ladejobi
- Chinedu Ikedieze as Big Chi
- Folu Storms as Tina
- Bimbo Manuel as Uncle Richard
- Wale Ojo as Uncle Tunde
- Deyemi Okanlawon as Cashflow
- DJ Xclusive as Jide
