= Fatuma (film) =

2018 Tanzanian drama film

- Directed by: Jordan Riber
- Written by: Jordan Riber; Andrew Whaley
- Produced by: Jordan Riber; John Riber; Louise Riber
- Starring: Ayoub Bombwe; Cathryn Credo; Beatrice Taisamo
- Cinematography: Talib Rasmussen
- Edited by: Jordan Riber; Louise Riber
- Music by: Jordan Riber
- Distributed by: Media for Development International (MFDI)
- Release date: 1 May 2018 (Tanzania)
- Running time: 85 min.
- Country: Tanzania
- Language: Swahili

Fatuma (theatrically as Hadithi za Kumekucha: Fatuma), is a 2018 Tanzanian drama film directed by Jordan Riber and co-produced by director himself with his parents; John Riber and Louise Riber. It is the sequel to its first feature film Hadithi za Kumekucha:TUNU. The film stars Beatrice Taisamo in lead role along with Ayoub Bombwe and Cathryn Credo in supportive roles.

The film deals with the rural hard life of a woman with her daughter where she faces several challenges when a man interferes with her daughter's life. It was filmed at Arusha region of Tanzania. The film also influenced by radio program 'Kumekucha' aired across Tanzania in 2016 and 2017.

== Cast ==
- Beatrice Taisamo as Fatuma
- Ayoub Bombwe as Mwanyusi
- Cathryn Credo as Neema
- Kulthum Maabad as Senyinge
- MacDonald Haule as Kidevu
- Tishi Abdallah as Sheena
- Sudi Muhamedi as Ali
- Seif Mbembe as Go-Between
- Loin Wina as Nyato
- Shabani Hamis as Danny

== Awards ==
The film received critical acclaim and won several awards at international film festivals. The film won four awards in the special category for Swahili Movies at the 2018 Zanzibar Film Festival for Best Picture, Best Actress, Best Director, and Best Cinematography. Actress Catherine Credo won the Best Actress award and Jordan Riber won the Best Director award.
