= Zanzibar International Film Festival =

Film festival held annually in Zanzibar, Tanzania

- Opening film: Janani: The Last Stand
- Location: Zanzibar, Tanzania
- Founded: 1997
- Most recent: June 25-29, 2025
- Awards: Golden Dhow, Silver Dhow
- Website: https://www.ziff.or.tz/

Zanzibar International Film Festival (ZIFF), also known as Festival of the Dhow Countries, is an annual film festival held in Zanzibar, Tanzania and one of the largest cultural events in East Africa. ZIFF is a non-governmental organization established in 1997 to develop and promote film and other cultural industries as catalyst for the regional social and economic growth.

== History ==
The festival is an all-arts affair, with 8 days of local and international discussion panels, workshops, 10 days of screenings of the best local and international cinema and evenings of musical concerts including a Gala each evening. All festival programs are a culmination of the realization of the capacity of film to fuse together the best of each art-form, offering a wide range of Entertainment, Educating and Networking options for world audiences.

The festival is arguably the largest multidisciplinary art and cultural festival in Africa, and continues to lead as a tourist attraction event in the region. ZIFF now gives 12 International Awards presented by 5 International Juries. It is estimated that 7000 western tourists came to Zanzibar to attend the festival and the total festival audience was in excess of 100,000 with wide appeal across race, class and religions. Its impact on the economy of Zanzibar is unquestionable.

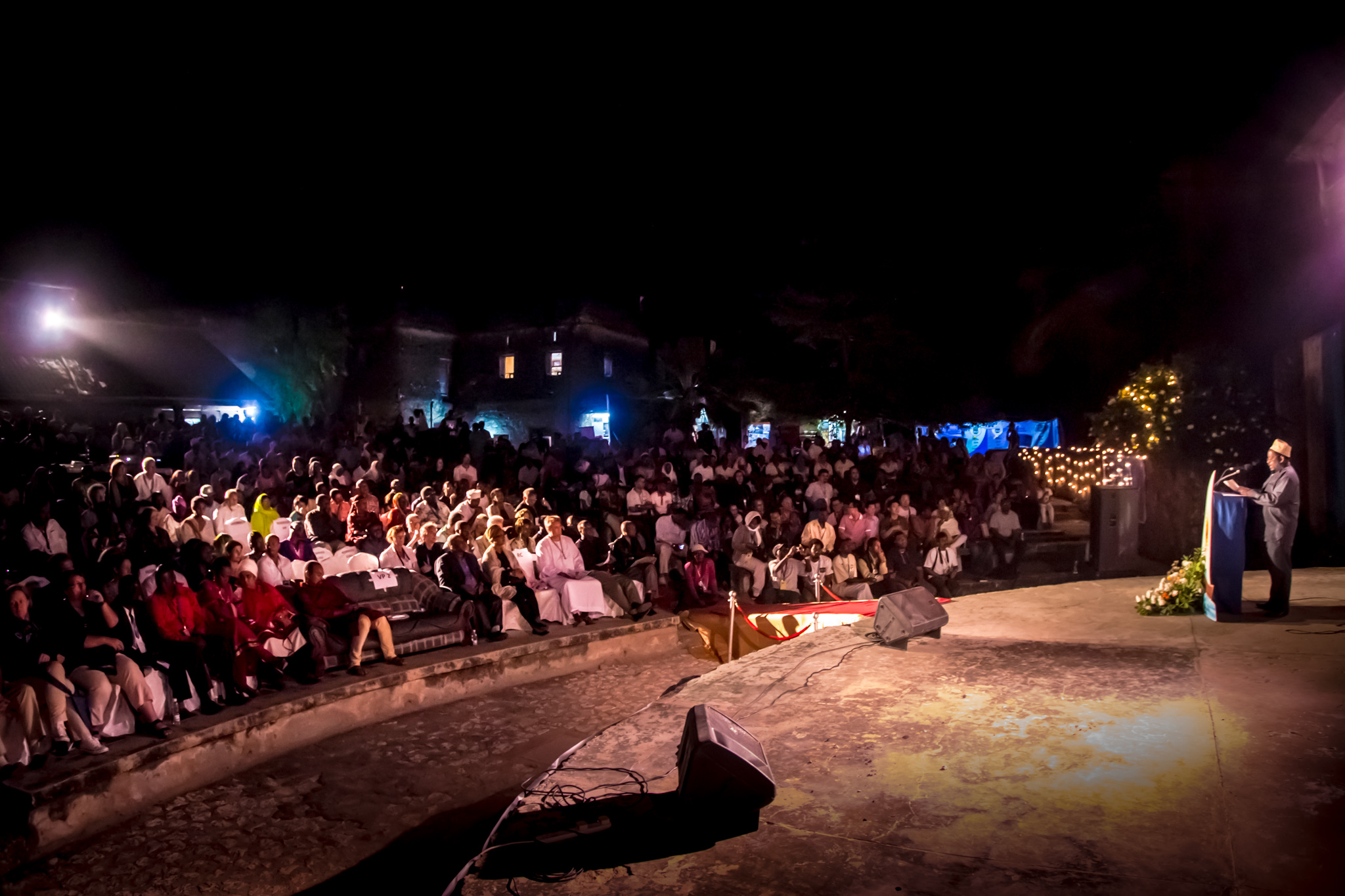
2013 audience

The ZIFF festival now runs 15 programs over the 10 days that include:

1. Film Competition
2. Film Workshops
3. Opening and Closing Nights
4. Film Outreach Projections
5. Women panorama
6. Children panorama
7. Village panorama
8. Festival of Festivals
9. Soko Film
10. Art and Exhibition
11. Children Film panorama
12. UNICEF Life skills Camps
13. Children Peace camps
14. Difficult Dialogues
15. Historical and Cultural Village Tours

During the festival, films are shown in Stone Town in Zanzibar City, as well as rural Zanzibari villages.

== Awards ==
- Golden Dhow
- Silver Dhow
- Documentary
- Short/Animation
- East Africa Talent
- ZIFF Jury Award
- UNICEF Award
- ZIFF Life Time Achievement Award
- ZIFF Chairman Award
- Sembene Ousmane Award
- Signis Award
- East Africa Region Talent
- Signis Jury Award — Commendation
- Verona Award

== Golden Dhow winners ==
Year	Film	Director	Country of origin	Ref.
1998	Maangamizi: The Ancient One	Martin Mhando, Ron Mulvihill	Tanzania/United States	
2000	Jinnah	Jamil Dehlavi	Pakistan	
2001	Bawandar (The Sand Storm)	Jagmohan Mundhra	India	
2004	Maargam (The Path)	Rajiv Vijay Raghavan	India (in Malayalam)	
2005	Khakestar-o-Khak (Earth and Ashes)	Atiq Rahimi	Afghanistan	
2006	L'Appel Des Arenes (Wrestling Grounds)	Cheikh Ndiaye	Senegal/Morocco/Burkina Faso/France	
2007	Juju Factory	Balufu Bakupa-Kanyinda	Democratic Republic of Congo	
2008	Ezra	Newton I. Aduaka	Nigeria/France	
2009	Jerusalema	Ralph Ziman	South Africa	
2010	Themba	Stefanie Sycholt	South Africa	
2011	The Rugged Priest	Bob Nyanja	Kenya	
2012	Uhlanga	Ndaba Ka Ngane	South Africa	
2013	Golchereh	Vahid Mousaia		
2014	Half of a Yellow Sun	Biyi Bandele	United States	
2015	Wazi FM	Faras Cavallo	Kenya	
2016	Watatu	Nick Reding	Kenya	
2017	Noem My Skollie	Daryne Joshua	South Africa	
2018	Supa Modo	Likarion Wainaina	Kenya/Germany	
2019	Fatwa	Mahmoud Ben Mahmoud	Tunisia	
2021	Binti	Seko Shamte	Tanzania	
2022	Vuta N'Kuvute (Tug of War)	Amil Shivji	Tanzania	
2023	Eonii	Eddie Mzale	Tanzania	
2024	Goodbye Julia	Mohamed Kordofani	Sudan	
