= Redemption (2019 film) =

2019 Mozambique Crime film

- Film poster
- Directed by: Mickey Fonseca
- Written by: Mickey Fonseca
- Produced by: Mickey Fonseca; António Forjaz (as Pipas Forjaz)
- Starring: Gil Alexandre; Arlete Guillermina Bombe; Laquino Fonseca
- Cinematography: António Forjaz
- Edited by: António Forjaz
- Production company: Mahla Films
- Release date: July 18, 2019
- Running time: 1h 40minutes
- Country: Mozambique
- Languages: Portuguese; English

Redemption, also known as Resgate, is a 2019 Mozambican crime film directed by Mickey Fonseca. It is the first Mozambican-made film to be featured on Netflix and at the time of its release on the streamer in July 2020, was the only film from a Portuguese-speaking African country in its catalogue. The story revolves around a life of crime as the lead character decides to change his life and be a better father after spending four years, but ends up returning to a life of crime. It was nominated for nine awards and won two of them at the Africa Movie Academy Awards.

== Synopsis ==
A man who has just returned from prison finds out that, just before dying, his mother took on a dangerous debt. Although he wants to turn a new leaf, he is forced to once again go back to a life of crime as he needs money desperately.
