= Sew the Winter to My Skin =

2018 film

- Film poster
- Directed by: Jahmil X.T. Qubeka
- Written by: Jahmil X.T. Qubeka
- Produced by: Layla Swart
- Starring: Kandyse McClure
- Cinematography: Jonathan Kovel
- Edited by: Layla Swart
- Music by: Braam du Toit
- Production company: Yellowbone Entertainment
- Release dates: 8 September 2018 (TIFF); 8 February 2019 (South Africa)
- Running time: 118 minutes
- Country: South Africa
- Languages: Afrikaans; Xhosa; English

Sew the Winter to My Skin is a 2018 South African action film directed by Jahmil X.T. Qubeka. It was screened in the Contemporary World Cinema section at the 2018 Toronto International Film Festival. It was selected as the South African entry for the Best Foreign Language Film at the 91st Academy Awards, but was ultimately not nominated. The title is not a borrowed phrase, it was created for the film.

== Plot ==
In early 1950s South Africa, an African "Robin Hood" steals from the rich white people to give to the poor. Based on the exploits of John Kepe.

== Cast ==
- Ezra Mabengeza as John Kepe
- Kandyse McClure as Golden Eyes
- Peter Kurth as Gen. Helmut Botha
- Zolisa Xaluva as Black Wyatt Earp
- Bok van Blerk as Simon Potgieter
- Dave Walpole as The Scarfaced Kid
- Mandisa Nduna as Birthmark

== See also ==
- List of submissions to the 91st Academy Awards for Best Foreign Language Film
- List of South African submissions for the Academy Award for Best Foreign Language Film
