= Miango =

- Town
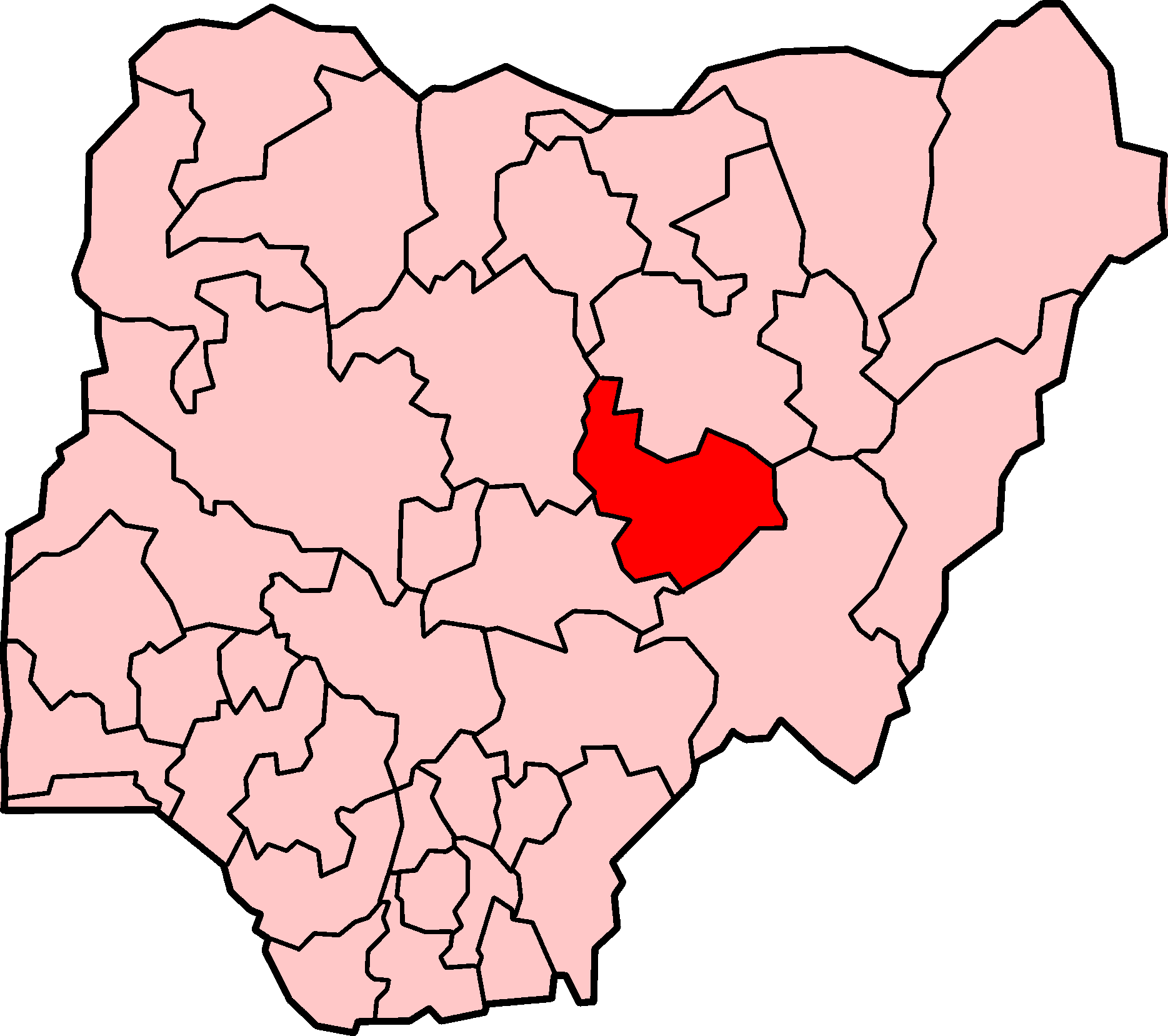

- Location within Nigeria
- Coordinates: 09°51′N 08°41′E
- Country: Nigeria
- State: Plateau State
- LGA: Bassa
- Chiefdom: Irigwe
- Time zone: UTC+01:00 (WAT)
- Climate: Aw

Miango is a town in Plateau State, in central Nigeria.

== History ==
Miango is a Town in Bassa Local Government Area of Plateau State. The natives of this village are the Irigwe people, who are very hospitable and friendly. There are a lot of tourist attractions in the village like Water falls, High hills, the Miango rest home, etc. In the early 1900s the SIM Missionaries came to the area and established the Miango Rest Home. Miango rest home which is closer to ENOS HOSPITAL, the only massive licensed hospital in the community which started operations in 2011. Christianity was brought to the region by ECWA missionaries who also built churches and a couple of schools.

Miango and the surrounding communities has a population of over 20,000 people, more than 50% of which are women and children.

Though the region is sometimes plagued by religious crisis, Miango people are very friendly and industrious. Many of them are farmers and are responsible for supplying enormous amounts off eggs, fresh red pepper, maize, tomatoes, big sized Irish and sweet potatoes, carrots, cabbages, watermelon, cucumber, wheat and bean to the rest of Nigeria.

== Ancha Village Massacre ==
On 8 September 2017, Fulani tribesmen attacked and killed twenty Christians in an apparent reprisal attack in the village of Ancha, Miango District. A week earlier, a young Fulani boy from Ancha had been found murdered in a nearby village. The Muslim Fulani believed that the boy had been killed by Christians from Ancha, a fact that the locals strongly denied. Nineteen members of Ancha's Salama Baptist Church were among those killed.
