= Seko Shamte =

Tanzanian film producer, writer and director

- Born: September 29, 1981 (age 44)
- Occupation: Filmmaker
- Spouse: Amour Shamte (m. 2011)
- Website: alkemistmedia.com

Seko Shamte (born 29 October 1981) is a Tanzanian film producer, writer and director.

== Early life ==
Seko Shamte grew up in Dar es Salaam but spent some of her early years in the United States of America as well as Asia. Her parents, Fulgence and Antonia Tingitana, father an engineer and mother, an education specialist encouraged the development of her writing skills by sending her to writing camps over the summer holidays. At Mzizima High School where she studied she formed an appreciation for history and music. She played the violin and was the chairperson of the music club. During a talent show at Zanaki Secondary School, she was a visiting performer for Radio One. At 17 years that performance went on to give her an entry into the media industry, with her own show on East Africa Radio.

== Career ==
After finishing her BSc in finance with a minor in media at Marymount College Manahattan College in 2005 she went to work at East Africa Television as the Head of Programming. During her tenure (2005–08) she oversaw the creation and televising of the popular television programs Ze Comedy, Friday Night Live, 5 Live! and Nirvana. Ze Comedy is the highest ever rated comedy sketch show on Tanzanian television.

Seko Shamte started her own production company, Alkemist Media in 2008 producing programmes and films about Tanzania and Africa for international distribution. For CNN's Inside Africa and Inside Story, these included stories on Tanzanian NBA basketball player Hashim Thabeet and his contribution to his community in Tanzania and the migration of Maasai men in Tanzania. This was followed by a series of other pieces for CNN, ABC networks in the United States and BBC in the UK.

=== Mkwawa: Shujaa wa mashujaa ===
In 2011, her first feature-length documentary was released, Mkwawa: Shujaa wa Mashujaa which she had developed over sixteen years. The critique of a history teacher on Chief Mkwawa being ‘a coward, as most African leaders are…’ gave her pause and wanting to challenge that critique, she researched Chief Mkwawa's history for herself. When the story was ready, she applied for the Tanzania Media Fund (TMF) and won the grant. The documentary was released in 2011.

=== The Team Tanzania ===
Following Mkwawa she went on to co-write, produce and direct The Team: Tanzania, a televisions series about gender inequality in Tanzania and aiming to transform society’s gender norms. The story follows two teenage girls, Upendo and Sophia, and their struggle for identity. The thirteen part series was in collaboration with the NGO Search for Common Ground and aired on East Africa Television. The series can be viewed on YouTube.

=== Home Coming ===
In 2015, her feature film Home Coming was released in Dar es Salaam. The story is an examination on corruption and how it perpetuates itself, generation after generation.

Home Coming was well received by the Tanzanian Film Industry. The film went on to be selected to screen at the Pan African Film Festival in 2017.

Seko’s next project is slated to be a documentary on Julius Kambarage Nyerere, the first president of Tanzania.

== Filmography ==
Year	Title	Role	Notes
2011	MKWAWA: Shujaa wa Mashujaa	Writer, producer, director	Feature Documentary
2014	The Team Tanzania	Writer, producer, director	Television series
2015	'Jikoni na Marion	Producer, director	Television cooking show
2015	Home Coming	Writer, producer, director	Feature film
2018	Mid Night	Writer, co-producer, director	Short film
2023	Sweta	Executive producer	Short film

== Recognition ==
In 2017, Shamte participated in a panel at Oxford University. She discussed the changing state of the African continent, focusing on media transformation and technology. Additionally, she, among others, signed the stealth mode monumental collaborative art piece Iyasile Naa, also known as The Legacy.
