= Luxor African Film Festival =

Annual film festival in Egypt

- Location: Luxor, Egypt
- Founded: 2012
- Founded by: Sayed Fouad, Azza al-Husseny
- Most recent: 2025
- Directors: Sayed Fouad
- Hosted by: Independent Shabab Foundation (ISF)
- Language: Egyptian Arabic; English

The Luxor African Film Festival (LAFF) is an annual film festival for African cinema held in Luxor, Egypt. Founded in 2012, the Luxor African Film Festival is run by the Independent Shabab Foundation (ISF). In October 2019 the Malmö Arab Film Festival recognized LAFF for having "made great strides and [become] one of the most important festivals specialized in African cinema".

Writer Sayed Fouad and director Azza al-Husseny were involved as festival's cofounders. First conceived in mid-2010, the first edition took place in February 2012.

== Awards ==
The festival awards prizes for both short and long films. In 2013 the prizes were as follows:

- The Grand Nile Prize for Best Long Film: $10,000 and The Golden Mask of Tutankhamen
- The Jury Prize for Long Film: $8,000 and The Silver Mask of Tutankhamen
- The Prize for Best Artistic Contribution in a Long Film: $5,000 and The Bronze Mask of Tutankhamen
- The Grand Nile Prize for Short Film: $5,000 and The Golden Mask of Tutankhamen
- The Jury Prize for Short Film: $4,000 and The Silver Mask of Tutankhamen
- The Prize for Best Artistic Contribution in a Short Film: $3,000 and The Bronze Mask of Tutankhamen

== Annual editions ==
Edition	Dates	Prizes
1st	February 2012	Grand Nile Prize (Long Film): Soul Boy; Jury Prize (Long Film): Our Beloved Sudan; Best Artistic Achievement (Long Film): Born on the 25th of January; Grand Nile Prize (Short Film): Short Life; Jury Prize (Short Film): The Cry of the Dove; Best Artistic Achievement (Short Film): The Bottom of the Pit; Radwan Al-Kashef Award (Short Film): Living Skin and The Cassava Metaphor
2nd	18–24 March 2013	Salah Abou-Seif Best Film Award (Long Film): Hidden Beauties; Special Jury Award (Long Film): Nairobi Half Life; Technical Achievement Award (Long Film): La Pirogue; Certificates of Recognition (Long Film): Coming Forth by Day and Town of Runners; Best Film Award (Short Film): Habsin / Softly on Saturday Morning; Special Jury Award (Short Film): Studio; Technical Achievement Award (Short Film): 9th April 1938: Bousculades; Radwan El-Kashef Award: My Beautiful Nightmare
3rd	2014	Grand Nile Prize (Long Narrative): Imbabazi: The Pardon; Jury Prize (Long Narrative): The Rooftops; Best Artistic Achievement (Long Narrative): Tall As A Baobab Tree; Special Awards: Hassan Ben Badida and Jim Neversink; Grand Nile Prize (Long Documentary): Doaa Aziza; Jury Prize (Long Documentary): The Devil's Lair; Best Artistic Achievement (Long Documentary): The River and Emirs in Wonderland; Grand Nile Prize (Short Narrative): Wooden Hand; Grand Nile Prize (Short Documentary): Made in Gougou; Best Artistic Achievement (Short Film): Haunted Souls; Special Mention: Reda and The Projectionist; Radwan Al-Kashef Award: El Bostan El Saaed Street
4th	2015	Grand Nile Prize (Long Narrative): The Blue Elephant; Jury Prize (Long Narrative): The Sea Is Behind; Best Artistic Achievement (Long Narrative): Beti and Amare; Special Mentions: L'Œil Du Cyclone and Umutoma; Grand Nile Prize (Long Documentary): Beats of the Antonov; Jury Prize (Long Documentary): Suffering is a School of Wisdom; Best Artistic Achievement (Long Documentary): Paths to Freedom; Radwan al-Kashef Prize: The Past Will Return; Grand Nile Prize (Short Narrative): Warda; Grand Nile Prize (Short Documentary): Motherland; Special Mention: Matanga and Father
5th	17 – 23 March 2016	Grand Nile Prize (Long Narrative): Mona; Jury Prize (Long Narrative): Without Regret; Best Artistic Achievement (Long Narrative): Free State; Grand Nile Prize (Long Documentary): We Have Never Been Kids; Jury Prize (Long Documentary): Sembene; Best Artistic Achievement (Long Documentary): Roundabout In My Head; Grand Nile Prize (Short Narrative): Stranded; Grand Nile Prize (Short Documentary): Aida
6th		Grand Nile Prize (Long Narrative): Kalushi; Jury Prize (Long Narrative): The Children of the Mountain; Best Artistic Achievement (Long Narrative): Our Preacher and Hedi; Grand Nile Prize (Long Documentary): Footprints of Pan-Africanism; Jury Prize (Long Documentary): Little Eagles; Best Artistic Achievement (Long Documentary): White Potion; Grand Nile Prize (Short Film): Le Bleu, Blanc, Rouge des mes Cheveux; Jury Prize (Short Film): We Are Just Fine Like This; Best Artistic Achievement (Short Film): Kandil El Bahr
7th	2018	Grand Nile Prize (Long Narrative): The Originals; Jury Prize (Long Narrative): Keteke; Best Artistic Achievement (Long Narrative): Benzine; Samir Farid Award (Long Narrative): Wallay; Radwan El-Kashef Prize (Long Narrative): Benzine; Grand Nile Prize (Long Documentary): Mama Colonel; Jury Prize (Long Documentary): Waithira; Best Artistic Achievement (Long Documentary): New Moon; Special Mention (Long Documentary): Sister Courage; Grand Nile Prize (Short Film): Pantheon; Jury Prize (Short Film): Nice, Very Nice; Best Artistic Achievement (Short Film): Imfura; Special Mention (Short Film): Companionship
8th	March 2019	Grand Nile Prize (Long Narrative): The Burial of Kojo; Jury Prize (Long Narrative): Exterior Night; Best Artistic Achievement (Long Narrative): Sew the Winter to My Skin; Special Mention (Long Narrative): Look At Me; FIPRESCI Prize – LAFF 2019 (Long Narrative): Until the End of Time; Radwan El-Kashef Prize (Long Narrative): Mabata Bata; Grand Nile Prize (Long Documentary): Lost Warrior; Jury Prize (Long Documentary): Whispering Truth to Power; Best Artistic Achievement (Long Documentary): Dreamaway; Best Artistic Achievement (Freedom Film): House of the Rivers; Jury Prize (Freedom Film): The Mercy of the Jungle; Al Husseiny Abou-Deif Prize (Freedom Film): Urgent; Grand Nile Prize (Short Film): Timoura; Jury Prize (Short Film): Tithes and Offering; Best Artistic Achievement (Short Film): Ales; Special Mention (Short Film): Sega

== See also ==
- Lists of festivals
