= Ayoub Bombwe =

Tanzanian actor

- Born: Ayoub Kondo Bombwe
- Occupations: Actor, screenplay writer, choreographer, director
- Years active: 2015–present
- Notable work: Natasha; Bahasha

Ayoub Kondo Bombwe, is a Tanzanian actor. He is notable for the roles in the films Bahasha and Fatuma. Apart from acting, he is also a screenplay writer, choreographer and director.

== Career ==
He acted in two critically acclaimed films in 2018; Bahasha and Fatuma. For his role 'Mwanyusi' in Fatuma, Bombwe was nominated for the Best Actor in a Leading Role at Africa Movie Academy Awards (AMAA) in 2019.

== Filmography ==
Year	Film	Role	Genre	Ref.
2018	Bahasha	Kitasa	Films	
2018	Fatuma	Mwanyusi	Film	
