= Damalie (TV series) =

Ugandan television series

- Genre: Drama
- Created by: Doreen Mirembe
- Written by: Rehema Nanfuka; Bella Balungi; Keith Lukwago; Christine Mbabazi; Sandra Kose
- Directed by: Kisha Joseph; Pamela Keryeko; Sadiq Mugisha; Nicholas Nsubuga; Hadijah Nakanjako
- Starring: Doreen Mirembe; Mark Agume; Denis Kinani; Ssewanyana Arthur; Phillip Luswata; Nana Kagga; Cotilda Inapo; Esther Bwanika; Arthur William Ssewanyana; Atuhaire Sharon
- Music by: Jose's Arins Emanzi; Joan Etiang
- Country of origin: Uganda
- Original language: English

Production
- Executive producer: Doreen Mirembe
- Producers: Doreen Mirembe; Esther Bwanika; Usama Mukwaya; Isima Ssemujju
- Production location: Kampala
- Cinematography: Isaac Ekuka; Salim Muhumuza
- Editors: Baker Mutumba; Shamila Bagala; Sophia Sebbi; Peter Suuna
- Running time: 25–30 minutes
- Production company: Amani Production House

Original release
- Network: Pearl Magic Prime; Pearl Magic; Pearl Magic Loco; Showmax
- Release: August 8, 2023 – present

Damalie is a Ugandan award winning drama television series created and starring actress and producer Doreen Mirembe in the title role. It premiered on MultiChoice Uganda's Pearl Magic Prime Channel in Uganda on 8 August 2023 and soon afterwards aired on Pearl Magic, Pearl Magic Loko and Showmax the same year.

The show's second season premiered on September 30, 2024 airing three days a week in a new timeslot on all channels replacing Beloved.

In July 2025, it was announced that the show would air five days a week Mondays to Fridays from the previous three days Monday to Wednesday schedule

The show won several awards for Best TV Series Drama at the Uganda Film Festival Awards 2024 and 2025, Mashariki African Film Festival, IKON Awards, New Vision Awards and Pearl International Film Festival in 2024. Doreen Mirembe also won the Best Actress Award in a TV Series from all the above mentioned awarding bodies for her role in the show.

== Plot ==
The show follows Damalie, who finds herself knitting a web lies to hide her secrets and lies after the sudden return of her husband Charles back to Uganda from the UK where he had been for years for medical training. She will stop at nothing to hide anything that would stain her image.

== Casting and production ==
Casting for the show started in 2021 at Amani Production House in Kampala. Mirembe was cast in the lead and title role, Damalie and then casting for the rest of the cast followed with seasoned names in the industry joining throughout the seasons. All production was done at Amani Production House in conjunction with MultiChoice Uganda.

== Awards and nominations ==
Awards and nominations
Year	Award	Category	Recipient	Result	Ref
2025	Uganda Film Festival Awards	Best TV Drama series	Doreen Mirembe	Won	
2024	Uganda Film Festival Awards	Best TV Drama series	Doreen Mirembe	Won	
2024	Uganda Film Festival Awards	Best Actress in TV Drama series	Doreen Mirembe	Won	
2024	Uganda Film Festival Awards	Best Actor in TV Drama series	Kenny Rukundo	Nominated	
2024	Mashariki African Film Festival	Best TV Series	Doreen Mirembe	Won	
2024	IKON Awards	Best TV Series	Doreen Mirembe	Won	
2024	IKON Awards	Best Actress TV Series	Doreen Mirembe	Won	
2024	New Vision Awards	Best TV Series	Doreen Mirembe	Won	
2024	New Vision Awards	Best Actress TV Series	Doreen Mirembe	Won	
2024	Pearl International Film Festival	Best TV Series	Doreen Mirembe	Won	
