= 3rd iKON Awards =

Ugandan film awards

- Date: March 29, 2025
- Site: Kampala Serena Hotel; Kampala, Uganda
- Hosted by: Flavia Tumusiime, Salvado
- Produced by: Usama Mukwaya
- Directed by: Bushingtone

The 3rd Ikon Awards ceremony, presented by the Ikon Inspire Foundation, honored Ugandan films released from 2023 and 2024, and will take place at the Kampala Serena Hotel in Kampala, Uganda, on March 29, 2025.

== Schedule ==
Date	Event
Friday, January 31, 2025	Nominations announcement
February, 2025	Nominees luncheon
Saturday, March 29, 2025	IKON Awards

== Nominees and winners ==
The nominations were announced by television stars Ethan Kavuma and Catherine Namugenyi on January 31, 2025. One of the key highlights of this year’s awards, hosted live Friday on the Ikon Awards Youtube Page, was the expansion of the nominee slots in each of the 22 competitive categories from four to five, offering greater recognition for outstanding talent.

“What makes this year’s Ikon Awards special is that we have expanded the number of nominees, creating more room to celebrate exceptional work. This time, we are stronger than ever in championing inclusivity and celebrating diverse voices in the film and television industry,” said Usama Mukwaya, Ikon Awards Producer.

== Awards ==
Best Film	Best Director
Makula, Nisha Kalema; Soccer Heart, Kevin Johns Nabukenya; Maria, Nana Kagga; Karamoja, Eleanor Nabwiso; The Lions of Buganda, Sesanga Jerry	Nisha Kalema and Dan Mugisha, Makula; Richard Mulindwa, Half Life; Kevin Johns Nabukenya, Soccer Heart; Nana Kagga, Maria; Sesanga Jerry, The Lions Of Buganda
Best Actor	Best Actress
Issa Massade Yusuf, Soccer Heart; Isaac Khaweka, At the Crossroads; Prince Joe Nakibinge, Omukululo; Ssekimpi John Mary, Present Past; Lubega Edris, Half Life	Pelly Peninah Nampanga, Maria; Rehema Nakitto (Ray P), Not A Wife; Nabakiibi Joana Jojo, Omukululo; Nisha Kalema, Makula; Hasifah Nakitende, Present Past
Best Actor in a Supporting Role	Best Actress in a Supporting Role
Bwanika Baale Felix, Ssekukkulu; Raymond Rushabiro, Soccer Heart; Muhmood Zamunyo, Maria; Housen Mushema, Makula; Edson Keith Abitegeka, Ssekukkulu	Nana Kagga, Maria; Milka Irene, Not A wife; Eleanor Nabwiso, Karamoja; Nakayo Veronica, Christmas Together; Joanitta Bewulira Wandera, Makula
Best Screenplay	Ikon Rising Star
Nisha Kalema, Makula; Nana Kagga, Maria; Mary Nyanzi and Eleanor Nabwiso, Christmas Together; Kevin Johns Nabukenya, Soccer Heart; Josephine Kabahuma and Samuel Savior Kizito, Ssekukkulu	Iradukunda Rebecca Hope; Arthur William Sewanyana; Barack Babala; Tyra Abok; Ethan Mwesigwa
Best Cinematography	Best Production Design
Alex Ireeta, Makula; Vincent Odoi, Maria; Alex Ireeta, Soccer Heart; Izaek Ekuka, Christmas Together; Izaek Ekuka, Karamoja	Imran Musabbeh, Makula; Nana Kagga, Maria; Imran Musabbeh, Soccer Heart; Mulindwa Richard, Half Life; Tumusiime Robert Quintes, The Lions of Buganda
Best Costume Design	Best Makeup and Special Effects
Tazibone Solomon, Maria; Ali Musinguzi, Dollar Fashionista and Naggayi Patricia, The Lions of Buganda; Nantege Joan, Karamoja; Nantege Maureen Victoria, Makula; Nantege Joan, Soccer Heart	Nabakiibi Joana Jojo, Latifah Nabatanzi and Rutaro Abell, The Lions of Buganda; Kabanywari Maggie, Half Life; Nakakande Cynthia, Makula; Nantege Joan, Karamoja; Nantege Joan, Maria
Best Editing	Best Sound
Kizito Sudaisy Sebowa, Soccer Heart; Henry Matovu and Kizito Sudaisy Sebowa, Makula; Marvin Rain Ssentongo, Muhwezi Herbert, The Lions of Buganda; Paul Katumwa, Vincent Odoi, Maria; Paul Kimera, Karamoja	Isiko Abubaker, Karamoja; Jose Arins, Makula; Kyobe Sebbowa, Soccer Heart; Marvin Rain Ssentongo, The Lions of Buganda; Simon Agola, Maria
Best Visual Effects	Best Animation Film
Patrick Chris Black and Faysal Mukalazi, The Lions of Buganda; Lazarus Musungu, Dinner For Three; Nsiimbe Isaac Newton, Staple	Kataleya; Fractured; Kintu; Maica; Stuck in the Nest
Best Actor in a TV Series	Best Actress in a TV Series
Abby Mukiibi Nkaaga, Sanyu; Dennis Kinani, Damalie; Derrick Baka, Beloved; Emmanuel Atuhaire, Crossroads; Moses Jr. Kiboneka, JDC	Diana Nabatanzi, JDC; Doreen Mirembe, Damalie; Hellen Lukoma, Beloved; Nicole Estella, Crossroads; Nana Kagga, Damalie
Best TV Series	Best Documentary
Sanyu, Mathew Nabwiso; Crossroads, by Ayeny T. Steve; Beloved, Nathan Magoola; Damalie, Doreen Mirembe; JDC, Allan Manzi	A History of film in Uganda; Charcoal and Courage; Ghetto Fist; Ghetto Mama; The Royal Summit
Best Short Film	Best Student Film
Jimbi, Tusabe Ivan; Boy No Fear, Jonathan Curtiss; Estranged, Sharifu Kisambira; Jua Kali, Ssemwogerere Nersky Nurudeen; Staple, Isaac Bbuye	The Chicken Thief; Dinner for Three; Emunyenye, Brian Mukisa; Not my daughter; The Boy from Kampala
Ikon Fellow Film of the Year	Best Emerging Film
Take My Hand	Ssekukulu

=== Life Time Achievement Award ===
- Abby Mukiibi Nkaaga

=== African Ikon of the Year ===
- Patience Ozokwor
- Kanayo O. Kanayo

=== African Rising Star Award ===
- Liyabona Mroqoza

== Presenters and performers ==
TBA
