= Savannah MOON =

Ugandan film production company

Savannah MOON Productions
- Company type: Content, film & TV production
- Industry: Film & television
- Founded: 2009; 16 years ago in Kampala, Uganda
- Founder: Nana Kagga
- Headquarters: Kampala, Uganda
- Products: The Life; Beneath the Lies - The Series
- Owners: Nana Kagga, Meme Kagga

Savannah MOON (known as Savannah MOON Productions) is a creative film, television, animation and web production company in Kampala, Uganda. Its major productions include The Life (2012), the award-nominated Beneath the Lies - The Series (2014), MELA, and the award-winning Mukisa.

== Services ==
In addition to creating, developing and producing content in-house, Savannah MOON also collaborates with other production houses, organisations and individuals on local, regional and international projects. Savannah MOON provides services through the film development cycle from project creation, pre-production, production and post-production. It also undertakes film distribution & marketing and talent development & management through ACTA.Talent, its affiliate and others.

== Productions ==
Savannah MOON has created and produced full-length feature films including The Life, Pieces of Me, My Sister's Keeper, Mukisa, and Goolo. Its TV series Beneath the Lies aired on Urban TV and was digitally distributed by MTN Uganda. Savannah MOON has also co-produced short films including the award-winning "The Last Breath" with Kampala Film School, and "The Quarry".

Savannah MOON is also involved in the initiative "You Are Limitless (YAL)", which aims to motivate, guide and encourage Africans, especially the youth to achieve their full potential.

== Filmography ==
=== Film ===
Year	Film	Producer(s)	Director	Notes
2012	The Life (feature film)	Meme Kagga (producer); Nana Kagga (producer)	Nana Kagga	Feature film produced by Savannah MOON. Starring Maureen Jolly, Gasuza Lwanga, Irynn Naddamba, Elvis Vampino Kirya, Susan Nava.
2017	"The Last Breath" (short film)	Meme Kagga (executive producer); Nana Kagga (executive producer); John Denzel Damulira (associate producer); John Braise Ndawula (producer); Ian Masters (producer)	Jordan Braise Ndawula	Short film produced by Savannah MOON, Kampala Film School, Balkon Films. Starring Tona Rucci, Elvis Mutebi, Lillian Mbabazi, Aggie Kebirungi. Official Selection at Zanzibar International Film Festival 2017, Slum Film Festival 2017, Afrikans On Film Festival 2017, Colombo Student Film Festival 2017, Uganda Film Festival 2017 - won best student film, Euro African Kampala Film Festival 2017, Pearl International Film Festival 2017 - won Best Short Film & Best Young Actor. Screened on AfrolandTV|NetStudios. Distributed by AfricaXP.
2018	"The Quarry" (short film)	Eddie Kagutuzi (executive producer) Meme Kagga (executive producer) Nana Kagga (executive producer)	Eddie Kagutuzi	Short film produced by Savannah MOON, Baby Plantatin Productions, Balkon Films. Starring Melissa Mulungi Senfuma, Philipp Funccius, Eddie Kagutuzi, Sasha Achipa, Elvis Mutebi. First UK screening at Prince Charles Theater, Leicester Square, UK. Official Selection at Ridgefield International Film Festival 2018, Film in Africa 2018 - nominated for Baobab Award, Euro-East Africa Film Festival 2019, Mashariki Film Festival 2019, Uganda Film Festival - Best Short Film 2019. Distributed by AfricaXP.
2020	"Embeera" (short film)	Meme Kagga (executive producer) Nana Kagga (executive producer) Geoffrey Kasozi (producer)	Nana Kagga	Short film produced by Savannah MOON, Geoffix99 Films. Starring Carol Nanyonjo, Hassan Madvan, Isabella Akello. Official Selection at the This is Uganda Film Festival 2020, Piton International Film Festival. Honorary mention at London Seasonal International Film Festival 2020. Distributed by AfricaXP.
2020	"Ubuntu" (short film)	Meme Kagga (executive producer) Nana Kagga (executive producer) Geoffrey Kasozi (producer)	Nana Kagga	Short film produced by Savannah MOON, Geoffix99 Films. Starring Patience Nakamanya, Prossy Nabugobagana, Isabella Akello, Chloe Naava Kagga Macpherson. Official Selection at the This is Uganda Film Festival 2020. Distributed by AfricaXP.
2021	Empaabi (feature film)	Meme Kagga (executive producer) Nana Kagga (executive producer) Geoffrey Kasozi (executive producer) Vicent Sseruyange (producer)	Geoffrey Kasozi, Nana Kagga	Feature film produced by Savannah MOON, Geoffix Films, Spectrum Media Uganda. Starring Hassan Madvan, Carol Nanyonjo, Shamiru Kigenyi, Patience Nakamanya. Distributed by Rushlake Media.
2022	My Sister's Keeper (feature film)	Meme Kagga (executive producer) Nana Kagga (executive producer)	Nana Kagga	Feature film produced by Savannah MOON. Commissioned by Maisha Magic Movies. Starring Tania Kankindi, Gloria Nambozo, Hussein Marijan.
2022	Mukisa (feature film)	Meme Kagga (executive producer) Nana Kagga (Eexecutive producer)	Geoffrey Kasozi	Award-winning feature film produced by Savannah MOON. Commissioned by Maisha Magic Movies. Starring Tracy Kababiito, Isa Ngobi, Carol Nanyonjo. At the Uganda Film Festival 2023, Mukisa won Best Feature Film, Tracy Kababiito won Best Lead Actress in a Feature Film, Geoffrey Kasozi won Best Director, and Nana Kagga won Best Production design.
2022	Pieces of Me (feature film)	Meme Kagga (executive producer) Nana Kagga (executive producer)	Nsubuga Nicholas	Award-winning feature film produced by Savannah MOON. Commissioned by Maisha Magic Movies. Starring Nana Kagga, Prynce Okuyo, Nsubuga Nicholas.
2022	Nalwawo	Meme Kagga (executive producer) Nana Kagga (executive producer)	Emokor Eric	Feature film produced by Savannah MOON, Geoffix Films, Spectacle Media. Starring Nana Kagga, Raymond Rushabiro, Tania Kankindi, Suubi Kanyike. Official Selection at the Out of Africa Film Festival 2022, Silicon Valley International Festival 2022, Uganda Film Festival 2022. Distributed by Rushlake Media.
2023	Goolo	Meme Kagga (executive producer) Nana Kagga (executive producer)	Geoffrey Kasozi	Award-winning feature film produced by Savannah MOON. Commissioned by Maisha Magic Movies. Starring Ethan Nathan, Kajubi Imran, Frenisha Ngozi, Immaculate Mutebi.
2024 (TBA)	Nze Maria (working title)	Meme Kagga (executive producer) Nana Kagga (executive producer) Geoffrey Kasozi (producer)	Nana Kagga	Feature film by Savannah MOON Productions. Principal photography completed in October 2023. Starring Peninah Nampanga, Nana Kagga, Henry Nathan Katongole, Patrick Ssenoga, Mariam Kubita.

=== Television ===
Year	Film	Producer(s)	Director	Notes
2018	Mela	Nana Kagga (executive producer); Meme Kagga (producer)	Nana Kagga; Marie Corrazon	Web television drama series. Starring Malaika, Daniel Omara, Cleopatra Koheirwe, Denis Kinani, Marie Corrazon, Sarah G-Snake Namukwaya, Lesham Kenogo, Momo Jacobs, Daisy Owomugisha, River Dan Ragaju, Deedan, Lucy Bunyenyezi, Timothy Kibirango. Theme song by Shena Skies. Distributed by DIFFA, AfricaXP.
2016	Reflections (pilot episodes)	Nana Kagga(executive producer); Meme Kagga (producer)	Nana Kagga	TV series (in development)
2014	Beneath the Lies - The Series	Cedric Babu Ndilima (executive producer); Nana Kagga(executive producer); Meme Kagga (producer)	Joseph Kitsha Kyasi; Tosh Gitonga	Television drama series

=== Music videos ===
Year	Artist	Song	Director	Notes
2014	Ruyonga	"The Life Theme Song"	Nana Kagga	
2021	Melissa Mulungi	"Empire of Love"	Nana Kagga	

=== Short videos ===
Year	Video	Client	Director
2023/24	Type 1 Diabetes (T1D) educational videos - Phase II (several in various languages)	Sonia Nabeta Foundation	Nicholas Nsubuga, Geoffrey Kasozi
2022	Type 1 Diabetes (T1D) educational videos - Phase I (English, Luganda, Swahili)	Sonia Nabeta Foundation	Nicholas Nsubuga
2019	Book reads for The Old Mzee who swallowed a fly and Tendo's Wish by Catherine Kreutter	Old Mzee Books	Nana Kagga
2018	"Sugar cane growing in Luuka District"	See Them Grow Foundation	Nana Kaggga

== Awards and nominations ==
Year	Work	Festival	Nominee	Role	Award
2017	"The Last Breath" (short film)	Uganda Film Festival 2017		Best student film	Won
2017	"The Last Breath" (short film)	Pearl International Film Festival 2017		Best Short Film	Won
2017	"The Last Breath" (short film)	Pearl International Film Festival 2017	Tona Rucci	Best Young Actor	Won
2018	"The Quarry" (short film)	Film in Africa 2018		Baobab Award	Nominated
2019	"The Quarry" (short film)	Uganda Film Festival 2019		Best Short Film	Won
2022	Nalwawo (feature film)	Uganda Film Festival 2022	Meme Kagga, Nana Kagga	Best Ingenious Feature Film	Won
2022	Nalwawo (feature film)	Uganda Film Festival 2022	Nana Kagga	Best Leading Actress	Won
2022	Nalwawo (feature film)	Uganda Film Festival 2022	Sarah Kisawuzi	Best Supporting Actress	Nominated
2022	Nalwawo (feature film)	Uganda Film Festival 2022	Raymond Rushabiro	Best Leading Actor	Nominated
2022	Nalwawo (feature film)	Uganda Film Festival 2022	Nana Kagga	Best Production Design	Nominated
2022	Nalwawo (feature film)	Uganda Film Festival 2022	Nana Kagga	Best Screen-Play	Nominated
2022	Nalwawo (feature film)	Uganda Film Festival 2022	Wagaba Andrew	Best Post-Production/Editing	Nominated
2023	Mukisa (feature film)	Uganda Film Festival 2023	Meme Kagga, Nana Kagga	Best Feature Film	Won
2023	Mukisa (feature film)	Uganda Film Festival 2023	Geoffrey Kasozi	Best Director	Won
2023	Mukisa (feature film)	Uganda Film Festival 2023	Tracy Kababiito	Best Leading Actress	Won
2023	Mukisa (feature film)	Uganda Film Festival 2023	Isa Ngobi	Best Supporting Actor	Nominated
2023	Mukisa (feature film)	Uganda Film Festival 2023	Carol Nanyonjo	Best Supporting Actress	Nominated
2023	Mukisa (feature film)	Uganda Film Festival 2023	Nana Kagga	Best Production Design	Won
2023	Mukisa (feature film)	Uganda Film Festival 2023	Meme Kagga, Nana Kagga	Best Film in indigenous language	Nominated
2023	Mukisa (feature film)	Uganda Film Festival 2023	Meme Kagga, Nana Kagga	Viewer's Choice	Nominated
2023	Mukisa (feature film)	Uganda Film Festival 2023	John Paul (JP) Mboira	Best Cinematography	Nominated
2023	Mukisa (feature film)	Uganda Film Festival 2023	Nana Kagga	Best Costume Design	Nominated
2023	Mukisa (feature film)	Uganda Film Festival 2023	Nantege Joan	Best Make-up	Nominated
2023	Mukisa (feature film)	Uganda Film Festival 2023	Geoffrey Kasozi	Best Sound Design	Nominated
2023	Mukisa (feature film)	Uganda Film Festival 2023	Paul Katumwa	Best Post Production/Editing	Nominated
2023	Mukisa (feature film)	Uganda Film Festival 2023	Nana Kagga	Best Screen-Play	Nominated
2023	Mukisa (feature film)	Ikon Awards 2023, Uganda	Tracy Kababiito	Best Leading Actress	Nominated
2023	Pieces of Me (feature film)	Uganda Film Festival 2023	Nana Kagga	Best Lead Actress	Nominated
2023	Pieces of Me (feature film)	Uganda Film Festival 2023	John Paul (JP) Mboira	Best Cinematography	Nominated
2023	Pieces of Me (feature film)	Uganda Film Festival 2023	Nalukwago Swabrah	Best Make-Up	Nominated
2023	Pieces of Me (feature film)	Uganda Film Festival 2023	Nana Kagga	Best Screen-Play	Nominated
2023	Pieces of Me (feature film)	Ikon Awards 2023, Uganda	Sarafina Muhawenimana	Best Supporting Actress	Nominated
2023	Pieces of Me (feature film)	Ikon Awards 2023, Uganda	Nana Kagga	Best Production Design	Nominated
