= Prestige (TV series) =

Ugandan television series

- Genre: Drama
- Starring: Nana Kagga; Cleopatra Koheirwe; Symon Base Kalema; Karolyn Kash
- Country of origin: Uganda
- Original language: English
- No. of seasons: 3
- No. of episodes: 374

Production
- Producer: Nathan Magoola
- Camera setup: Alternative Two Camera
- Running time: 30 minutes
- Production company: Ava Juliet Productions

Original release
- Network: Pearl Magic Prime
- Release: February 8, 2021 – present

Prestige is a Ugandan television drama series produced by Nathan Magooola and starring Nana Kagga, Cleopatra Koheirwe as Jazmine and Eunice respectively, two sisters and ad executives fighting to rise above each other. The series was commissioned by MultiChoice Uganda. It was produced under Ava Juliet productions and premiered on February 8, 2021, on Pearl Magic Prime channel at the launch of the channel.

== Cast ==
- Nana Kagga as Jazmine (Sn1)
- Elizabeth Bwamimpeke as Jasmine (Sn2 -)
- Cleopatra Koheirwe as Eunice Kintu
- Raymond Rushabiro as Milton
- Evelyn Sandra Kironde as Chelsea Kintu
- Karolyn Kash as Arianna Winstead
- Symon Base Kalema as Jeje
- Martin "Yoyo" Nkoyoyo as Benefits
- Joanitta Bewulira-Wandera
- Daniel Omara

== Awards and nominations ==
Awards & Nominations
Year	Award	Category	Nominee	Result	Ref
2021	Uganda Film Festival Awards	Best Television Series	Nathan Magoola	Won	
2021	Uganda Film Festival Awards	Best Actress in TV Drama	Nana Kagga	Won	
2021	Uganda Film Festival Awards	Best Actress in TV Drama	Cleopatra Koheirwe	Nominated	
2021	Uganda Film Festival Awards	Best Actor in TV Drama	Symon Base Kalema	Nominated	

== List of Episodes ==
=== Series overview ===
Season	Episodes	Originally aired	
Season	Episodes	First aired	Last aired
1	100	February 8, 2021	June 25, 2021
2	260	June 28, 2021	June 24, 2022
3	TBA	June 27, 2022	TBA
