= Diana Nabatanzi =

- Born: Uganda
- Education: Ndejje University
- Occupations: Entertainer, TV presenter, scriptwriter etc

Diana Nabatanzi is a Ugandan film entertainer, radio personality, TV presenter, film maker, essayist, chief and a scriptwriter. She is now a moderator at BBS Terefayina where she has different shows including a morning show called sumulula, kasukali and uga hood show.

== Background ==
Diana is a Ugandan, a daughter to Fred Magala and Rosemary Nanteza and she's the second born of five children. She was born in Kampala.

== Education ==
Diana went to St. Elizabeth primary school for her elementary level then she joined St Mary's Nsuba for her O level. Thereafter, she joined St Joseph Centenary school for her A' Level education. After completing secondary education, she did a diploma in journalism and mass communication at Kampala University. She later pursued a Bachelor's degree in business administration at Ndejje University.

== Movie career ==
Diana started her movie career earlier while in primary by participating in school dramas and singing. After her senior six, she began seeking after her vocation in film acting. She joined a production company known as "Aromatic films" and she started featuring in movies such as Sikola, Bwebatyo, call 112, house arrest, abakyala bazira, the maker and bunjako the first horror movie that was produced in Uganda.

In 2017 she acted in a drama series known as Nawolovu that was premiered at Bukedde TV, after her production company "Aromatic films" came up with another successful drama series known as Entuunnusi. She also starred in a drama TV show known as "Mistakes Girls Do" which was airing on a TV station known as Pearl Magic and was produced by Richard Mulindwa under Limit production in 2017. She also featured in John Segawa's Honorables that was airing on NTV Uganda and later at Pearl magic.

== Media career ==
Diana carried out her internship at a Christian radio station known as Prime radio while in pursue for a Diploma in Journalism and Mass Communication. She later joined Uganda Broadcasting Corporation where she worked for 2 years and also Pearl FM radio station. She was also nominated as the best actress in TV drama 2016 and 2018 in the Uganda film festival awards. She was on billboard for an electoral commission advert.

== Personal life ==
Diana runs a foundation known as Tanzi foundation. She runs a private life in that it's hard to tell the name of her husband. Rumour has it that she has two children which she denies publicly.
