= Tenywa =

Tenywa may refer to:

== People ==
- Tenywa Bonseu (born 1976), Ugandan footballer
- Ezekiel Tenywa Wako of Busoga, Kyabazinga of Busoga

== Other uses ==
- Kamali Tenywa, fictional character
