= Frank Walusimbi =

Ugandan journalist and communications professional

- Born: August 29, 1981 (age 45); Kasese District, Uganda
- Citizenship: Ugandan
- Education: Uganda Christian University; Uganda Martyrs University
- Occupations: Journalist, television presenter, communications professional
- Years active: 2004–present
- Employer: United Nations High Commissioner for Refugees
- Known for: News anchoring and current affairs broadcasting
- Awards: Golden Pen Award (2005); Uganda National Journalism Awards (2015); Uganda National Journalism Awards (2020); Uganda National Journalism Awards (2021)

Frank Walusimbi (born 29 August 1981) is a Ugandan journalist, television presenter and communications professional. He is known for anchoring Luganda news and hosting Current Affairs programmes at NTV Uganda.

He has been awarded awards for journalism including Uganda National Journalism Awards for Features Reporting in 2015, Arts Reporting in 2020 and The impact of COVID-19 on the arts in 2021. Since 2022, he has worked as an Associate Communications Officer with the United Nations High Commissioner for Refugees (UNHCR) in Uganda.

== Early life and education ==
Walusimbi was born on 29 August 1981 at Kilembe Mines Hospital in Kasese District, Uganda. He attended Busega Preparatory Primary School and later Uganda Martyrs' Secondary School, Rubaga, where he completed his secondary education.

He studied Mass Communication at Uganda Christian University (UCU) in Mukono and later obtained a master's degree in Development Studies from Uganda Martyrs University in Nkozi.

== Career ==
Walusimbi began his journalism career while studying at Uganda Christian University. In 2004, he contributed articles to the Sunday Vision magazine, and in 2005 he joined the Daily Monitor as a features writer and reporter. He joined NTV Uganda in 2006, moving from print journalism into television.

At NTV Uganda, he worked as a news anchor and reporter and became known for presenting the station's Luganda-language news bulletin and also hosted current affairs programmes at the station.

In April 2022, he left NTV Uganda after about 15 years. In May 2022, he was appointed Associate Communications Officer at the United Nations High Commissioner for Refugees (UNHCR) in Uganda.

== Awards and recognition ==
Year	Award	Category / Work
2005	Golden Pen Award	Arts and Culture Journalist of the Year
2015	Uganda National Journalism Awards	Features – Eaten Alive
2020	Uganda National Journalism Awards	Arts Reporting – Songs of Resistance
2021	ACME Awards 2021	The impact of COVID-19 on the arts

== See also ==
- Journalism in Uganda
- NTV Uganda
- Faridah Nakazibwe
- Flavia Tumusiime
- Josephine Karungi
