= A Dog Story =

- Official poster
- Directed by: Davidson Mugume
- Screenplay by: Doreen Mirembe
- Produced by: Doreen Mirembe
- Starring: Doreen Mirembe; Michael Wawuyo Jr.; OpipoOpolot; ZziwaJaubarl
- Cinematography: Doreen Mirembe
- Edited by: Monica Mugo
- Music by: Monica Mugo
- Production company: Amani House
- Distributed by: Amani House
- Release date: June 2015 (Kampala Festival)
- Running time: 19 minutes
- Country: Uganda
- Language: English

A Dog Story is a Ugandan short film about Atim, a young woman who tries to escape from her abductor Bongwat and comes face to face with the reality of what it means to be an abductee, and the consequences of requiting his love. It was produced by actress and dental assistant Doreen Mirembe as her debut production.

== Production ==
A Dog Story is Doreen Mirembe’s debut production which she developed in 2013 while still deep in the acting world but by that time she wasn’t well equipped enough to produce the story herself. She wrote the idea on paper but couldn’t write the script. By late 2014, she had gotten close to some filmmakers she could trust enough to tell her story, she got in touch with Luswata Musa (a script writer) to teach and guide her about story, script and screenplay writing so as she could write her story. In 2015, she had pitched the story to a few who welcomed the project and aimed at getting it all produced on the budget of five million shillings that she had by at the time. In January 2015, the final date of shooting was set to 27th, and all shooting took place in Gayaza at Doreen Mirembe’s family home.

== Reception ==
The film got a very wide and good reception worldwide. It was screened and nominated at the Kampala Festival, Africa International Film Festival, Silicon Valley African Film Festival, Uganda Film Festival, Afro Film Festival (ANANSE), Slum Film Festival for the Best Short Film and Pearl International Film Festival for the Best screenplay. The film also won two awards at the Pearl International Film Festival for Best Actor (Michael Wawuyo Jr. and Best Actress (Doreen Mirembe).

== Casting ==
Doreen Mirembe cast herself in the lead role as Atim because she couldn’t trust anyone else satisfying the role the way she felt it as she wrote the story. The lead male role that had been cast didn’t turn up on the first day of shoot and Michael Wawuyo Jr. was immediately called on set to take the character of Bongwat. He had to read, understand and execute the story in just a few hours to the shoot ZziwaJaubarl and OpioOpolot were cast in supporting roles.

=== Cast ===
- Doreen Mirembe as Atim
- Michael Wawuyo Jr. as Bongwat
- Opipo Opolot
- Zziwa Jaubarl

== Awards and nominations ==
Awards
Year	Award	Category	Result	Recipient
2017	Slum Film Festival	Best Short Film	Nominated	
2017	Silicon Valley African Film Festival	Best Short Film	Nominated	
2016	Pearl International Film Festival	Best Female Actor in a Short Film	Won	Doreen Mirembe
2016	Pearl International Film Festival	Best Male Actor in a Short Film	Won	Michael Wawuyo Jr.
2016	Pearl International Film Festival	Best Screenplay	Nominated	
2016	Africa International Film Festival	Best Short Film	Nominated	
2016	Uganda Film Festival	Best Short Film	Nominated	
2016	Afro Film Festival (ANANSE)	Best Short Film	Nominated	

== See also ==
- The Life
- Bala Bala Sese
