= Yoyo (musician) =

Ugandan musician

- Born: Martin Nkoyoyo Walaga; December 17, 1979; Uganda
- Citizenship: Ugandan
- Education: Makerere University
- Occupations: Singer; songwriter; actor
- Title: Board Chairperson, Uganda Performing Rights Society (UPRS)
- Father: Martin Tebaja Nkoyoyo

Yoyo also known as Martin Nkoyoyo Walaga is a Ugandan singer, songwriter and actor who performs in rhythm and blues (R&B). He serves as the chairperson of the Uganda Performing Rights Society (UPRS) an organisation involved in managing music performance rights and royalties.

== Early life and education ==
Yoyo was born on 17 December 1979, to Martin Tebaja Nkoyoyo a brother to former Archbishop of Church of Uganda, Livingstone Mpalanyi Nkoyoyo. He attended Central Nursery School and Lugazi East Primary School. He later joined St. M. Kalemba Senior Secondary School and St. Balikuddembe Secondary School before joining Makerere University where he pursued a Bachelor of Arts in Art.

== Music career ==
Yoyo developed an interest in music at an early age. His early musical experiences include singing in church and participating in karaoke competitions. He later performed with fellow students associated with Nagg Entertainment. He gained wider recognition with "Ansaana", a song featuring Priscilla Kalibala.

== Acting ==
In addition to music, Yoyo has been involved in acting in a television drama ''Prestigue'', aired on Pearl Magic Prime.

== Music industry leadership ==
In July 2024, Yoyo was elected to the board of the Uganda Performing Rights Society, representing singers alongside fellow musician Allan Toniks and since September 2024, Yoyo has been serving as the chairperson of the Uganda Performing Rights Society.

== Discography ==
Songs associated with Yoyo include;

- Ansaana (featuring Priscilla Kalibala)
- Silimba
- Tongaana
- Telephone
- Mata
- Nzija
- Jimpe
- Love Box
- My Love
