= Uganda Film Festival Award for Best Television Drama =

Category of film award

- Awarded for: Excellence in Cinematic Television Production Achievement
- Country: Uganda
- Presented by: Uganda Communications Commission (UCC)
- First award: 2016

The Uganda Film Festival Award for Best Television Drama is an award presented annually by Uganda Communications Commission (UCC) at the Uganda Film Festival Awards. The award which was introduced in 2016 to include television categories, is given in honor of a television producer who has exhibited outstanding production for television series.

== Winners and nominees ==
The table shows the winners and nominees for the Best Television Drama award.

Table key
indicates the winner

Year	Television	Producer(s)	Ref.
2016 (4th)	Coffee Shop	Mukeera Dennis Joshia	
2016 (4th)	Deception	George Khihumba	
2016 (4th)	It Can’t Be	Richard Mulindwa	
2016 (4th)	Taste of Time	Paul Mugisha	
2017 (5th)	Yat Madit	Irene Kulabako Kakembo	
2017 (5th)	Mistakes Girls Do	Richard Mulindwa	
2017 (5th)	The Honourables	John Ssegawa	
2017 (5th)	Coffee Shop	Davidson Mugume	
2017 (5th)	Second Chance	Phad Mutumba	
2018 (6th)	Mistakes Girls Do	Richard Mulindwa	
2018 (6th)	Live Your Dreams		
2018 (6th)	Anti Kale		
2018 (6th)	Taste of Time		
2019 (7th)	#Family	Mathew Nabwiso	
2019 (7th)	The Honourables	John Ssegawa	
2019 (7th)	Game of Lies	Bwanika Baale Felix	
2019 (7th)	Mistakes Girls Do	Richard Mulindwa	
2021 (8th)	Prestige		
2021 (8th)	Sanyu		
2021 (8th)	Mistakes Girls Do	Richard Mulindwa	
2021 (8th)	What If	Richard Mulindwa	
2021 (8th)	Chapters		
2022 (9th)	Prestige		
2022 (9th)	Sanyu		
2022 (9th)	Kyaddala		
2022 (9th)	What If		
2022 (9th)	Loving Tyra		
2026 (13th)	Choices	Richard Mulindwa	
2026 (13th)	Damalie	Doreen Mirembe	
2026 (13th)	Kavule Town	Usama Mukwaya	
2026 (13th)	Loving Beyond	Jerry Sesanga	
2026 (13th)	Ties That Bind	Shafic Sserwada	

== Multiple wins and nominations ==
=== By A Television Drama ===
No Television drama has won this award multiple times. However, several television dramas have received multiple nominations for this award over years as seen below;

Nominations	Television Drama
4	Mistakes Girls Do
2	The Honourables
2	Taste of Time
2	Coffee Shop

=== By a Producer ===
No producer has received multiple wins for this award. Some producers have received multiple nominations for their television series. Richard Mulindwa received nominations for different television series.

Nominations	Producer
6	Richard Mulindwa
2	John Ssegawa

== Records ==
- In 2017, Irene Kulabako Kakembo was the first female producer whose television drama series (Yat Madit) was nominated for the award, and became the first female producer to win the award with the same series that same year.
