= Jackline Katusiime =

Ugandan actress

- Known for: Film actress
- Notable work: Unheard (2023), Catch Out (2021), Foot Wine (2022), Beneath Beauty (2022)
- Awards: Best Actress in Leading Role at Ikon Awards 2024

Jackline Katusiime is a Ugandan actress known for her roles in Ugandan film and television, including her performances in Unheard (2023) which made her win the iKon Awards 2024 as the Best actress. she also played in Beneath Beauty (2022), Foot Wine (2022), and CatchOut (2021).

== Acting career ==
Katusiime participates in Ugandan cinema and television through different roles which include the following;

- She portrayed Grace in the Ugandan film called Unheard (2023), which tells a story about a young widow challenging cultural norms.
- She appeared in Beneath Beauty (2022), Foot Wine (2022), and Catchout (2021), showing her range across different film genres.

== Awards and recognition ==
She won the Best actress (Unheard (2023)) in a leading role in the ikon Awards 2024.

== Filmography ==
=== Film ===
- Unheard (2023)
- Beneath Beauty (2022)
- Foot Wine (2022)
- Catch Out (2021)

== See also ==
- Cinema of Uganda
- List of Ugandan films
- iKon Awards
