= Namirembe (disambiguation) =

Namirembe Hill is a hill in Kampala, Uganda.

Namirembe may also refer to any of the following:

- Namirembe Cathedral, the Provincial Cathedral of the Church of Uganda and the diocesan cathedral for Namirembe Diocese
- Namirembe Bitamazire (born 1941), Ugandan educator and politician
- Namirembe Hospital, the alternative name for Mengo Hospital
- Namirembe Hill Side High School, a high school in Kampala, Uganda's capital city
