= Family (2018 TV series) =

Ugandan sitcom

- Genre: sitcom
- Screenplay by: Mary Nyanzi; Conso Buzabo; Kwezi Kaganda
- Directed by: Kwezi Kaganda
- Starring: Eleanor Nabwiso; Mathew Nabwiso; Ruth Kamanzi; Sasha Serugo; Cleopatra Koheirwe
- Music by: Quad-A
- Country of origin: Uganda
- Original language: English
- No. of seasons: 1
- No. of episodes: 26

Production
- Executive producers: Eleanor Nabwiso; Matthew Nabwiso
- Production locations: Kampala, Uganda
- Cinematography: Mustague Abudalah
- Editor: Matovu King
- Running time: 25 minutes
- Production company: Nabwiso Films

Original release
- Network: NTV Uganda; Pearl Magic
- Release: December 16, 2018

#Family is a Ugandan sitcom created by the Nabwisos and produced at their Nabwiso Films production company. The series stars Eleanor and Mathew Nabwiso as Jackie and Frank Mpanga, the matriarch and patriarch of a middle-class Ugandan family and their daughter Molly (Ruth Kamanzi) and son Timothy (Sasha Serugo). The series also stars Cleopatra Koheirwe as Leah and radio presenter and TV news anchor Andrew Kyamagero as Uncle Robert. It premiered on NTV Uganda on December 16, 2018.

== Plot ==
Frank and Jackie Mpanga are a happily married couple with two children but their marriage is tested when Jackie's old college friend pays her a visit. Jackie then gets a job but Frank's traditional conservative beliefs start to crash on Jackie's new dream.

== Cast ==
Cast
Cast Member	Character	Type
Eleanor Nabwiso	Jackie Mpanga	Main
Mathew Nabwiso	Frank Mpanga	Main
Ruth Kamanzi	Molly Mpanga	Main
Sasha Serugo	Timothy Mpanga	Main
Cleopatra Koheirwe	Leah	Recurring
Allen Komujuni		Recurring
Andrew Kyamagero	Uncle Robert	Recurring

== Awards and nominations ==
Awards & Nominations
Year	Award	Category	Recipient	Result	Ref
2019	Uganda Film Festival Awards	Best Actress in a TV Drama	Eleanor Nabwiso	Won	
2019	Uganda Film Festival Awards	Best TV Drama	Matthew Nabwiso	Won	
2019	Uganda Film Festival Awards	Best Actor in a TV Drama	Matthew Nabwiso	Nominated	
