= Mela (Ugandan TV series) =

Ugandan web series

- Genre: Drama
- Created by: Nana Kagga
- Written by: Nana Kagga
- Directed by: Nana Kagga; Marie Corrazon
- Starring: Malaika; Daniel Omara; Denis Kinani; Lesham Kenongo; Marie Corrazon; Cleopatra Koheirwe
- Music by: Shena Skies
- Country of origin: Uganda
- Original language: English
- No. of seasons: 1
- No. of episodes: 10

Production
- Producers: Nana Kagga; Meme Kagga
- Production locations: Kampala, Uganda
- Editor: Marie Corrazon
- Running time: 30 minutes
- Production company: Savannah MOON

Original release
- Network: Urban TV
- Release: December 1, 2019 – 2020

Mela is a Ugandan web television series created and directed by Nana Kagga. It stars Malaika in the lead and her debut acting role as Mela Katende while Daniel Omara, Cleopatra Koheirwe, Lesham Kenogo, Denis Kinani and Marie Corrazon joined in supporting and regular roles. The series was entirely produced at Savannah MOON by producers and sisters Meme and Nana Kagga, who also co-executive produced the series. Nana co-directed the series with Marie Corrazon.

The series premiered in 2018 at a red carpet event at the Savannah MOON headquarters in Kampala. The series was later picked up by Vision Group for their Urban TV network in October 2019. Season 1 started airing on Urban TV on December 1, 2019.

== Plot ==
Mela Katende, an illegitimate child is raised by her step mother, struggles to live up to the expectations of her family, society and culture.

== Cast ==
Cast
Cast Member	Character	Type
Malaika	Mela Katende	Main
Daniel Omara	Amir Okot	Main
Denis Kinani	Richard Mulangila	Main
Lesham Kenongo	Maria Okot	Main
Marie Corrazon	Jackie Smith	Main
Cleopatra Koheirwe	Naava Katende	Recurring
Sarah Namukwaya	Sakina Smith	Recurring
Naava Kagga	Tewa Okot	Recurring
Daisy Owomugisha	Gladys	Recurring
Lucy Bunyenyezi	Nekesa	Guest
Mono Jacobs	Nyangan	Guest
Deedan Muyira	Paula	Guest
