= Esther Labu Chelangat =

Ugandan reproductive health activist

Esther Labu Chelangat is a Ugandan youth leader promoting sexual and reproductive health and rights (SRHR) as the president of the Youth Advisory Committee at SRHR Alliance Uganda. A law student at Makerere University, she is also active as a peer educator at Reach A Hand Uganda and as a youth leader at the Center for Health, Human Rights and Development (CEHURD).

== Education ==
She is a law student at Makerere University in Uganda.

== Advocacy and public work ==
She has publicly spoken and written on addressing gender inequality and power dynamics—rather than just awareness—as core drivers of teenage pregnancy and youth reproductive decision-making. She participated in interfaith dialogues (such as with faith leaders in Busoga) advocating against child marriage and holding institutions accountable regarding child protection and youth welfare.
