= Milka Irene =

Ugandan actress (born 1989)

Milka Irene Soobya
- Born: 1989 (age 36–37); Buwenge, Jinja, Uganda
- Citizenship: Ugandan
- Education: Kyambogo University
- Occupations: actor; politician
- Years active: 2013–present
- Notable work: Deception

Milka Irene Soobya is a Ugandan actress and politician most known for her breakout role as Monica on NTV Uganda's drama series Deception and as Fifi Aripa on Power of Legacy. She contested for the Woman Member of Parliament for Jinja after Jinja received city status.

== Career ==
=== Acting ===
Soobya's debut professional role was in a minor role on a Kenyan television series Makutano Junction which she was introduced to by Philip Luswata, one of the show's writers. She however gained popularity when she was cast in the lead role as Monica on NTV Uganda's drama series Deception from 2013 to 2016. She later worked on a Akpor Otebele directed film The Rungu Girls, Honeymoon is Exaggerated, Christmas in Kampala and Taxi 24. In 2018, she was cast on Power of Legacy as Fifi Aripa, a freeloader and Rachael's (Tania Shakira Kankindi) nosy best friend.

=== Politics ===
In 2020, Soobya joined active politics when she contested for the Woman Member of Parliament post for Jinja City under the National Resistance Movement flag after Jinja was declared a city.

== Filmography ==
| Year | Film/TV Series | Role | Notes |
|---|---|---|---|
| 2013 -2016 | Deception | Monica | Lead role |
| 2016 | Christmas in Kampala | | Christmas film |
| 2016 | The Rungu Girls | | |
| 2016 | Honeymoon is so Exaggerated | | Short |
| 2016 | Taxie 24 ug | Milka | TV Series |
| 2016 - to-date | Family Affairs | Herself – Co-host | Talk Show on Spark TV |
| 2018 | Power of Legacy | Fifi Arripa | Television series, main cast |
| 2019 | November Tear | Mama Anenda | Drama |

== Personal life ==
Soobya was born in Jinja to a family of Lt. Colonel Samuel Kafude Ngobi and Capt. Namutebi Agnes Mbuga, both UPDF soldiers. She attended Mbogo High School for O Level, Mariam High School for A-Level and Kyambogo University where she graduated with a degree in Procurement and Logistics Management.
