= Doreen Mirembe =

Ugandan actress (born 1987)

- Born: 4 October 1987 (age 38); Gayaza, Uganda
- Education: Makerere University
- Occupations: Actress; Dental assistant; Film producer
- Years active: 2005–present
- Awards: Pearl International Film Festival

Doreen Mirembe (born 4 October 1987), is a Ugandan actress, filmmaker, producer, and founder of Amani Production House. She is also a dental assistant at Pan Dental Surgery. She has acted in numerous films and TV series as well as producing her own movies.

== Career ==
In addition to several films and television commercials, Mirembe has appeared in TV series such as Deception NTV as Dr. Stephanie and Nana Kagga's Beneath The Lies as Miriam. She founded Amani House, her own film company. Her first film A Dog Story was an experimental film which garnered many nominations for Best Short Film and won two awards for Best Actor and Best Actress in a Short Film at the Pearl International Film Festival in 2006. She later produced her second and third film titled Nectar and Kafa Coh respectively.

Mirembe is an active in-service dental assistant at Pan Dental Surgery, Kampala.

== Filmography ==
Year	Film/TV Series	Role	Notes
2023	The Kitara Chronicles	Nagadya	Adventure
2023 -	Damalie	Damalie Kaganda	TV Series
2022	Kafa Coh	Sandra Atika Alexis	Directed by Gilbert K. Lukalia; Produced by Doreen Mirembe
2019 -	Kyaddala	Nurse Betty	Directed by Emmanuel Ikubese
2017 -	The Honourables	Honourable Specioza	created by John Ssegawa
2017	Mistakes Girls Do		TV Series
2016	A Dog Story	Atim	Short film
2014–2016	Beneath the lies - The Series	Mariam	created by Nana Kagga Macpherson
2013–2016	Deception NTV	Dr. Stephanie	TV Series
2017	Nectar	Writer/Producer	Her own Production
2016	New Intentions	Favour	Drama
2015	Queen of Katwe		Extra role
2014	Belated Troubles	Rona	Drama
	No Lie	Flavia	created by Mariam Ndagire
	Love Makanika	Cindy	

== Nominations and awards ==
Awards
Year	Award	Category	Film/TV Series	Result	Notes
2025	Pearl International Film Festival	Best TV Series	Damalie	Won	
2024	New Vision Awards	Best TV Series	Damalie	Won	
2024	New Vision Awards	Best Actress in a TV Series	Damalie	Won	
2024	IKON Awards	Best TV Series	Damalie	Won	
2024	IKON Awards	Best Actress in a TV Series	Damalie	Won	
2023	Pearl International Film Festival	Best Director	Kafa Coh	Won	Shared with Gilbert Lukalia
2023	Pearl International Film Festival	Best Feature Film	Kafa Coh	Won	
2023	Pearl International Film Festival	Best Screenplay	Kafa Coh	Won	
2023	Uganda Film Festival Awards	Best Screenplay	Kafa Coh	Won	Shared with Musa Luswata & Khai Sam
2023	Kaduna International Film Festival	Best Film	Kafa Coh	Won	
2023	IKON Awards	Best Film	Kafa Coh	Won	
2023	IKON Awards	Best Production Design	Kafa Coh	Won	
2023	IKON Awards	Best Director	Kafa Coh	Won	
2021	Zanzibar Film Festival	Best Actress	Catch Out	Won	
2017	Zanzibar International Film Festival	Best Short Film	Nectar	Nominated	
2017	Slum Film Festival	Best Short Film	A Dog Story	Nominated	
2017	Silicon Valley African Film Festival	Best Short Film	A Dog Story	Nominated	
2016	Pearl International Film Festival	Best Female Actor in a Short Film	A Dog Story	Won	Doreen Mirembe
2016	Pearl International Film Festival	Best Screenplay	A Dog Story	Nominated	
2016	Africa International Film Festival	Best Short Film	A Dog Story	Nominated	
2016	Uganda Film Festival	Best Short Film	A Dog Story	Nominated	
2016	Afro Film Festival (ANANSE)	Best Short Film	A Dog Story	Nominated	
