= Cowboys and Indians (film) =

- Produced by: Edward Stewart
- Starring: Britt George; Nana Kagga; Sebastian Rockefeller; Angela Watson; Shane Daniel Wood
- Production company: American Film Institute (AFI)
- Release date: 2007
- Running time: 13 minutes
- Country: United States
- Language: English

Cowboys and Indians is a 2007 American short film starring Britt George, Nana Kagga, Sebastian Rockefeller, Angela Watson for the American Film Institute.

== Cast ==
- Sebastian Rockefeller as Little Timmy
- Britt George as Dad
- Angela Watson as Mom
- Shane Daniel Wood as Cowboy
- Nana Kagga as Indian
