= Beneath the Lies – The Series =

- Genre: Drama, mystery
- Created by: Nana Kagga
- Written by: Nana Kagga
- Directed by: Tosh Gitonga; Joseph Kitsha Kyasi
- Starring: Flavia Tumusiime; Cedric Babu Ndilima; Gaetano Kagwa; Natasha Sinayobye; Hellen Lukoma; Daniel Omara; Patrick Salvado Idringi; Susan Nava; Deedan Muyira; Rabadaba; Michael Wawuyo Jr. Muheesi Baraba; Nana Kagga; Doreen Mirembe
- Country of origin: Uganda
- Original language: English
- No. of seasons: 1
- No. of episodes: 6 (list of episodes)

Production
- Executive producers: Cedric Babu Ndilima; Nana Kagga Macpherson
- Producer: Meme Kagga
- Cinematography: Andrew Mageto; Loukman Ali
- Camera setup: Alternative two camera
- Running time: 30 minutes
- Production companies: Savannah MOON Productions(2014); Kinetic Media Group (2014); 40Plus Productions (2016)

Original release
- Network: Urban TV Uganda
- Release: 17 December 2014 – 4 September 2016

Beneath the Lies (also known as Beneath the Lies – The Series or just Beneath the Lies Series) is a Ugandan television drama-mystery series created by Nana Kagga Macpherson and starring Flavia Tumusiime, Natasha Sinayobye, Gaetano Kagwa, Hellen Lukoma, Rabadaba, Deedan Muyira, Cedric Babu Ndilima, Patrick Salvado Idringi and Susan Naava as regular cast members. The series was directed by Joseph Kitsha Kyasi and Tosh Gitonga. It was originally produced by Savannah MOON Productions and Kinetic Media Group, before all production was taken over by 40Plus Productions, a production house co-owned by Nana Kagga and Cedric Babu Ndilima. It airs on Sundays at 9:30 p.m. EAT, on New Vision Group's Urban TV Uganda.

In December 2016, the series was nominated for Best Television Series at Africa Magic Viewers' Choice Awards (AMVCAs).

== Plot ==
Within the city of Kampala, lies a seedy underbelly of blackmail, drug trafficking, child prostitution and exploitation of women run by an unknown racket. When the lies beneath each relationship are exposed and loyalties are tested, only death and chaos can ensue.

== Production ==
The first two episodes of the series were produced by Savannah MOON Productions in conjunction with Kinetic Management group, and all the episodes were shot at different locations in Kampala. 40 Plus Productions took over production in 2016, starting with the third episode of the first season. At the same time, MTN Uganda took over digital marketing for the series.

The series is the creation of Nana Kagga, a former TV presenter and actress, remembered for her roles in A Good Day to Be Black & Sexy, Star Trek and CSI: Crime Scene Investigation.

The series ran for 30 minutes an episode on the 10:30 – 11 p.m. Urban TV time slot weekdays and repeated on Sundays before its hiatus.

== Theft and series hiatus ==
In December 2014, all pre-recorded material and equipment for episodes 3–12 of season one were stolen from storage during the end of the shoot wrap party. This brought the show to a very sudden hiatus after re-airing the first and second episode.

== Re-release ==
After the theft of BTL footage, re-shooting of the show began in January 2015. This started in early 2016 with mostly a new crew consisting predominantly of Ugandans.

Beneath the Lies was re-released on 31 July 2016 on Urban TV Uganda under 40 Plus Productions and MTN Uganda as its digital distributor. The show aired four more episodes after the re-release, with the last episode airing on 4 September 2016, making a total of six episodes and marking the premature end of the series.

== Cast ==
- Flavia Tumusiime as Kamali Tenywa
- Cedric Babu Ndilima as Mr. Stephen Amaru, Kamali's ex-husband, a powerful lawyer in Kampala. Many of the rich people are at his mercy; he safeguards their secrets.
- Natasha Sinayobye as Kaitesi Munyana, Kamali's sister
- Gaetano Kagwa as Abe Sakku, head of Mr. Amaru's security personnel
- Rabadaba as Simon/Suna Kintu, ashrewd businessman
- Hellen Lukoma as Hellen Mutungi, Mr. Stephen Amaru's secretary and former mistress
- Deedan Muyira as Tracy Kintu, Suna's wife
- Daniel Omara as Paul Mukasa, part of Amaru's security team
- Susan Naava as Ali, hitwoman for hire and minder
- Patrick Salvado Idringi as Kizito Semwanga, corrupt official
- Isaac Kuddzu as Tendo Amaru, Stephen Amaru's brother
- Marie Corrazon as Sarafina, Suna's step sister
- Alma Sophia Nagayi as Young Kamali
- Chloe Kirabo as Young Keitesi
- Michael Wawuyo Jr. as Shaban, IT specialist, computer hacker
- Mutebi Andrew Elvis as Officer Mande
- Muheesi Baraba as David, works for Suna
- Patrick Nkakalukanyi as Katumba, works for Kizito
- Eleanor Nabwiso as the Kintu’s helper
- Vince Musisi as Ojok as works for Kizito
- Nikita Gossai as Nantale, Kizito’s wife
- Elizabeth Bwamimpeke as Mama Kamali
- Nana Kagga as Attorney General
- Whitney Grace Najjuko as News reader
- Doreen Mirembe as Mariam

== Awards and nominations ==
Awards and nominations
Year	Award	Category	Result	Ref
2016	Africa Magic Viewers' Choice Awards (AMVCAs)	Best Television Series	Nominated	

== Episodes ==
No.	Title	Directed by	Written by	Original release date
1	"Reflections of Us"	Tosh Gitonga	Nana Kagga Macpherson	December 17, 2014
Kamali steals Mr. Amaru's (husband) laptop that contains very important information and delivers it to her boss (slaver) Mr. Suuna.
2	"Of Pasts Relieved"	Tosh Gitonga	Nana Kagga Macpherson	December 24, 2014
Mr. Amaru continues his search for his stolen laptop. Keitesi and her sister Kamali (Amaru's wife) are also arrested and investigations of where the laptop is spark off.
3	"Episode 3"	Joseph Kitsha Kyasi	Nana Kagga Macpherson	August 14, 2016
Mr. Amaru drags Kamali to one of his errands where they meet up with Tracy and Simon/Suna at a club. Things don't go well and Kamali is forced to leave. A drunk staggering Hellen walks into Mr. Amaru and the Attorneny General's meeting and embarrasses him.
4	"Episode 4"	Joseph Kitsha Kyasi	Nana Kagga Macpherson	August 21, 2016
Kaitesi is believed murdered and the police start investigating her murder starting interrogations with Kamali, who seems not ready to help with the investigations.
5	"Episode 5"	Joseph Kitsha Kyasi	Nana Kagga Macpherson	August 28, 2016
Kaitesi drags Paul to escape "hostage". Tracy and Simon get into another domestic fight. Kamali reveals to Mr. Amaru that she had been setup to marry him.
6	"Episode 6"	Joseph Kitsha Kyasi	Nana Kagga Macpherson	September 4, 2016
Kaitesi is hiding at Tracy's house. She has a plan to kill Suna, which Tracy first objects to before realizing that her loving husband wouldn't mind if she was raped and would leave her alone to go seek safety if the situation got sour.
