= Kamali Tenywa =

Fictional character from the television series Beneath The Lies

- Beneath The Lies - The Series character
- Kamali Tenywa with Abe Sakku
- First appearance: Reflections of Us (2014)
- Last appearance: Episode 6 (2016)
- Created by: Nana Kagga Macpherson
- Portrayed by: Flavia Tumusiime; Alma Sophia Nagayi

In-universe information
- Full name: Mrs. Kamali Tenywa Amaru
- Species: Human
- Gender: Female
- Occupation: Prostitute, Model
- Spouse: Mr. Stephen Amaru (ex-husband)
- Significant other: Abe Sakku
- Relatives: Kaitesi Munyana (cousin sister); Mama Kamali (mother); Tendo Amaru (ex-brother in-law)
- Religion: Christian
- Nationality: Ugandan

Mrs. Kamali Tenywa Amaru is a fictional character created by film producer, actress and screenwriter Nana Kagga Macpherson for Uganda's Urban TV series Beneath The Lies. Flavia Tumusiime portrayed Kamali from her debut in the pilot episode (Reflections of Us).

== Development and casting ==
The character Kamali was written as a lead role in the series. Flavia Tumusiime was appointed for the role as soon as Nana bore the series idea back in 2014. She was asked to recommend other actors and actresses and she called Natasha Sinayobye who garnered the role of Kaitesi Munyana, Kamali's cousin sister. Young Kamali was portrayed by newcomer and child actress Alma Sophia Nagayi.

== History ==
=== Season 1 ===
Kamali was introduced as a young girl (portrayed by Alma Sophia Nagayi) that was sold into prostitution with her best friend and sister Kaitesi Munyana. The ailing Mama Kamali gave her daughters up to a politician she trusted would take good care of them in Kampala city little knowing they would be sold into slavery and prostitution. Kamali Tenywa together with her sister Kaitesi worked for Suna Kintu and his wife Tracy both at their night club and "modeling" agency. Kamali was introduced to Mr. Amaru with the intention to discover all of his secrets and Mr. Amaru fell in love, sooner after wedding her. However, Kamali didn't stay in the marriage longer.
Kamali returns to Mr. Amaru's house to steal information which is when Mr. Amaru tracks her and drags her back home under tight security provided by Abe Ssaku, a man that had fallen in love with Kamali after sleeping with her at a house party before knowing who she was. Kamali started using her charms on Abe to get what she wanted, but still a prisoner in Stephen Amaru's house.
