= Taste of Time =

Ugandan web series

- CD Cover
- Genre: Drama
- Directed by: Richard Nondo
- Starring: Ejule Paul; Phiona Birungi; Eyangu James; Brommie Abrahams; Douglas Dubois Sebamala
- Country of origin: Uganda
- Original language: English
- No. of seasons: 4
- No. of episodes: 80

Production
- Producer: Paul Mugisha
- Production locations: Kampala, Uganda
- Running time: 30 minutes
- Production company: Jephin Films

Original release
- Release: 2015 – 2018

Taste of Time is a Ugandan television series created and directed by Richard Nondo for Urban TV Uganda. It stars Ejule Paul, Phiona Birungi, Eyangu James as Michael, Brommie Abrahams, and Douglas Dubois Sebamala as Andy. The series premiered in 2015, and ran for four seasons until its finale in 2018.

== Cast ==
Cast
Cast Member	Character	Type
Ejule Paul		Main
Phiona Birungi		Main
Eyangu James	Michael	Main
Brommie Abrahams		Main
Douglas Dubois Sebamala		Main

== Awards ==
Awards & Nominations
Year	Award	Category	Received by	Result	Ref
2016	Uganda Film Festival Awards	Best TV Drama	Paul Mugisha	Nominated	
2018	Uganda Film Festival Awards	Best TV Drama		Nominated	
2018	Uganda Film Festival Awards	Best Actress in TV Drama	Phiona Birungi	Nominated	
2018	Uganda Film Festival Awards	Best Actor in a TV Drama	Ejule Paul	Won	
