= Humphrey Nabimanya =

Uganda social entrepreneur

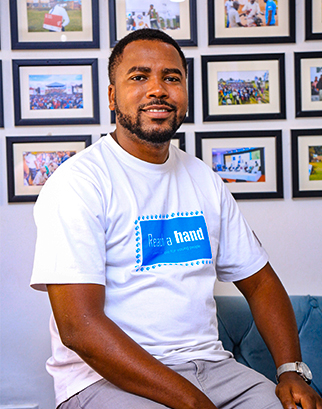
- Nabimanya at Reach A Hand Uganda
- Born: 14 November 1988 (age 37)
- Education: Makerere University
- Organization(s): Reach A Hand, Uganda
- Known for: Founder and team leader at Reach A Hand, Uganda
- Notable work: Executive producer, Kyaddala

Humphrey Nabimanya is a Ugandan social entrepreneur, philanthropist, peer educator, founder and team leader at Reach A Hand, Uganda. He founded the Ikon Awards.

== Early life and education ==
Nabimanya was born on 14 November 1988 and has seven siblings.

Nabimanya attended Rubaga Primary school (Queen of Peace) in 2003, Kiira College Butiki from 2004 to 2007 for his 0-level, and Namirembe Hillside High School between 2008 and 2009. In 2013, he graduated from Makerere University with a bachelor's degree in community psychology.

== Career ==
A recipient of the 2011 Young Achievers Award for Film and Photography, Nabimanya is a youth Sexual Reproductive Health and Rights advocate, leader, change agent and a presenter of a youth empowerment on NBS Television in Uganda.

In 2011, his first year at the university, Nabimanya founded Reach A Hand, Uganda a youth led non-profit organization focused on youth empowerment programs with an emphasis on Sexual Reproductive Health and Rights, HIV/AIDS awareness and prevention.

Through Reach A Hand Uganda, Nabimanya has created a movement of young advocates with a team of 46 members and 1,755 volunteers under the Peer Educators Academy who, by the end of 2020, had helped to reach over 6,618,171 people through various project interventions and 18,205,652 through social media. Reach A Hand Uganda has interventions in 66 schools reaching approximately 20,100 young people and 67,193 out of school young people.

Nabimanya educates youth about sexual reproductive health and rights. He supports his peers take control of their lives and present themselves in ways that inspires, impresses and spurs confidence in themselves and their peers under a platform where they have full opportunities to take part in the process of breaking barriers hindering them from making informed choices in life regarding their SRHR.

== Recognition and awards ==
- 2018 Most Influential Young Africans by the Africa Youth Awards
- Recipient for the Leadership Award at the ASFAS 2016
- Humanitarian Broadcasting personality by RTV Academy 2014
- Segal Family Foundation Annual Rising Star recipient 2014
- Recipient, Youth Advocate by Public Health Awards 2014
- Nominee MTV Base Africa Leadership Award in the MTV Africa Music Awards 2014
- Awarded by the president and the First Lady of Uganda towards his support to the youth through his Reach A Hand foundation
- Nambi Children's Initiative in 2012
- Awarded as a strong advocate and emerged up as a Young Achiever 2011
- Recipient of the 2011 Young Achievers Award for Film and Photography
- Teeniez TV Personality Buzz Teens Awards 2011
- Youth Mentor of the Year Award KIBO Foundation in 2010
- Received accolade from DSW for having won the SRH/R quiz that was conducted on 14 December 2009.
