= A Good Day to Be Black and Sexy =

- Theatrical release poster
- Directed by: Dennis Dortch
- Written by: Dennis Dortch
- Produced by: Dennis Dortch
- Starring: Nana Kagga
- Cinematography: Brian Harding
- Edited by: Dennis Dortch
- Music by: Henry Willis
- Distributed by: Magnolia Pictures
- Release date: December 5, 2008
- Running time: 92 minutes
- Country: United States
- Language: English

A Good Day to Be Black and Sexy is a 2008 film written, directed, produced and edited by Dennis Dortch. The film was originally screened at the 2008 Sundance Film Festival and was eventually given a one-week release in one theater, earning $8,629 during its release. The film explores the subject of sexuality and relationships within the black community in this collection of six vignettes set in Los Angeles designed to shatter stereotypes about black sexuality.

== Cast ==
- Kathryn Taylor as Jeanette
- Brandon Valley Jones as Tony
- Chonte Harris as Helena
- Marcuis Harris as D'Andre
- LaKeisha Blackwell as Jade
- Mylika Davis as Tamala
- Allen Maldonado as Jabari
- Jerome Hawkins as Julian
- Natalia Morris as Meagan
- Alisa Sherrod as Jill
- Nana Kagga as Candi
