= BBS Terefayina =

Ugandan television station

- Type: Digital channel
- Country: Uganda
- Broadcast area: Uganda
- Headquarters: Masengere Building, Mengo, Kampala District

Programming
- Language: Luganda
- Picture format: HDTV 1080i

Ownership
- Owner: Buganda Kingdom

History
- Launched: 12 April 2016

Links
- Website: www.bbstv.ug

BBS Terefayina, owned by Buganda Kingdom, is a Luganda language television station with its main offices at Masengere building in Mengo along Bulange road in Kampala District.

== Background ==
Buganda Broadcasting Services Limited was launched on 12 April 2016 owning its license and registration. It is owned by Buganda Kingdom led by Kabaka Ronald Muwenda Mutebi, the king of Buganda Kingdom holding its transmitters at its headquarters at Masengere building in Mengo. On 26 April 2017, BBS Terefayina celebrated first anniversary as a media broadcasting company that has managed to penetrate to the media market in Uganda. The company celebrated its seventh anniversary of broadcasting on the 19th August 2023.

BBS Terefayina has several media personalities like Diana Nabatanzi who presents Kiri Kitya show, a lunch hour television program, Tash Hubby, Florence Nampijja all known for their extreme media presence and all working as program presenters. The television network is also found on different pay TV channels like Startimes, DStv, Gotv and Free to Air decoders.

== Personalities ==
- Diana Nabatanzi is a Ugandan film entertainer, television presenter, essayist and script writer. She is well known for her lunch hour TV program, known as Kiri Kitya, which airs every Monday to Friday at BBS Terefayina. In 2023, she won accolades from HiSkool awards as the Best TV Personality in Uganda for the year 2023.
