= Namirembe Hill Side High School =

Location
- Kampala; Uganda
- 0°24′59″N 32°35′30″E

Information
- Funding type: Private
- Established: May 5, 1995
- Campus type: Suburban
- Website: namirembehillside.sc.ug

Namirembe HillSide High School is a private co-educational, non-sectarian and prime senior school. it was established on 5 May 1995 at Bakuli (Namirembe) along Mujunja Road before moving to the current location in Wakiso (Kampala District, Uganda). It started as an A-Level school with only sixty students. It was founded by Kiiza Hillary and Kyaligonza Robert.

Kiiza Hillary is a celebrated author of Christian Religious Education books for advanced level, an entrepreneur in education.

Due to expansion pressure (1999), the school was shifted from Bakuli to Luteete (Wakiso District) eight miles from the city center. The school started up O-Level with two classes (Senior One and Senior Two) with only twenty five Pioneer students, and sat for their Uganda Certificate of Education Examination in 2001.

== Notable alumni ==
- Humphrey Nabimanya, television presenter, founder and team leader at Reach A Hand Uganda.

== See also ==
- Entebbe Secondary School
