= Deception (Ugandan TV series) =

- Genre: Drama
- Created by: Edris Matu Segawa
- Written by: Louis Muhereza (seasons 1, 2, 6, 7, 8); Rakel Kwikiriza; Edris Matu Segawa (seasons 1-3 & 8 finale); Musa Luswata; Julie Nantambi; Jamil Mugabi
- Directed by: George Kihumbah N
- Starring: Milka Irene; Sarah Kisawuzi; Pretty Katende; Kabogooza Charles; Hussein Marijan; Stella Nante; Doreen Mirembe
- Country of origin: Uganda
- Original language: English
- No. of seasons: 8
- No. of episodes: List of episodes

Production
- Executive producer: Aggie Asiimwe Konde
- Producers: Edris Matu Segawa (seasons 1-3); Rosemary Nampijja(seasons 4-8)
- Cinematography: Abubaker Muwonge (seasons 1 -2); Joseph Magoba (seasons 3-8)
- Editors: Rosemary Nampijja (season 1); Maurine Kintu (seasons 2-8)
- Camera setup: Multiple-camera setup
- Running time: 30 minutes
- Production company: NTV Uganda

Original release
- Network: NTV Uganda
- Release: April 29, 2013 – August 29, 2016

Deception is a Ugandan drama television series developed by Edris Matu Segawa and directed by George Kihumbah. The series ran on NTV Uganda for eight seasons from 2013 to 2016. It won a number of awards, including 2014 RTV Awards for Best TV Drama of the Year, 2015 RTV Awards as Best TV Drama of the Year and 2016 Uganda Entertainment Award for Best TV Series.

During its first season the show had a running time of 30 minutes, which was extended to 45 minutes for the rest of its season. It aired every Mondays and Tuesdays at 8pm.

Deception became one of the most popular TV drama series in Uganda and the second attempt at TV shows by NTV Uganda after 2009's Kakibeki (What come may!). The show aired its last season in 2016 after a revered eight-season and three-year run.

== Plot ==
Monica and Chris Nsereko are a young happily married couple. Life is good, until Monica's mother in law decides to move in with them, demanding a grandchild.

The happy couple is dropped into scandal as the mischievous mother in law pulls every known trick to either get Monica pregnant or throw her out. Monica tries to play civil and tolerate her mother in law monster but is continuously encouraged by her close friend Lillian to retaliate and save her marriage. Monica previously had a miscarriage and believes that she may be barren.

The show focuses on family life and how intervention by in-laws can destroy and break a marriage. Along the way, Monica is forced to face impossible choices and keep dangerous secrets to save her marriage. As one lie is told to keep another true, Monica and Chris must find a way to rediscover their love.

== Awards and nominations ==
- 2014 - RTV Awards: Best TV Drama of the Year
- 2015 - RTV Awards: Best TV Drama of the Year
- 2016 - Uganda Entertainment Award: Best TV Series
- 2016 - Uganda Film Festival Awards: Best TV Drama, Best Actress in a TV Drama and Best Actor in a TV Drama
