= 30 Days of Flavia =

Book by Flavia Tumusiime

- Author: Flavia Tumusiime
- Language: English
- Subject: Life Stories
- Genre: non-fictional
- Published: Facebook
- Publisher: Flavia Tumusiime
- Publication place: Uganda
- Media type: Social Media, Website, TV
- Website: http://www.flaviatumusiime.com/30days.php

30 Days of Flavia is a book with a series of thirty stories from the life and career of the protagonist and author, Flavia Tumusiime. The stories were published on Flavia's Facebook page and later on her main website with the #30daysofflavia.

== Plot ==
30 Days of Flavia started in August 2015. It started with how Flavia Tumusiime got a job at 91.3 Capital FM. The stories profile Flavia's private and career life in a random order. She tells of how she got different media jobs what has kept her at most of her jobs. She advises her fans on how to deal with social, private and career problems. The stories were published daily on her Facebook page for 30 days. Every episode or chapter started with a title and would end with a piece of advice for the readers. Her last chapter titled "The Journey" was published just moments before appearing on NTV Uganda in an interview to officially close the stories of her life.

== Purpose ==
The purpose of the stories according to Flavia was to help the young people that were going through tough times and thought they were alone. 30 Days of Flavia tells of Flavia's personal life which has mistakes, burdens and hard times, a life most of her fans never knew about. She goes on to advise her readers every after each chapter,

Word of advice, even if you are at your last grain of strength, never show desperation. Be confident that the best asset is you and with that, you can acquire anything else..

Her last piece of advice was,

My last word of advice is..the bigger the burden/challenge, the bigger the blessing so hold on. #30daysofflavia"

== Reception ==
The stories garnered mostly positive reviews. In chapter (Day) 27 which was titled "Actions", Flavia wrote about how one's actions could send out wrong signals people. She described how she had sent wrong signals to US rapper J. Cole after an interview at Big Brother Africa in 2012 and how she turned him down. This chapter of her life was trending on social media platforms, radio and television. J. Cole's fans all over the world attacked Flavia with criticism as her fans commended her for sharing the story which had been loosely published in print media.
