= Aisha Kyomuhangi =

Ugandan actress, singer and producer

- Born: Uganda
- Occupations: CEO of Faisha Pictures International (2018–present); Singer; actress; film producer
- Years active: 2006–present
- Television: The Honourablez
- Spouse: not known
- Children: 2

Aisha "Lady Aisha" Kyomuhangi is a Ugandan actress, singer and producer. She has starred in numerous stage productions including Kigenya Agenya and is a member of Bakayimbira Dramactors, one of Uganda's oldest stage drama groups.

== Career ==
Kyomuhangi has been acting for over 20 years. She has worked on numerous films including The Last King of Scotland. She is best known for her roles in Ugandan TV series Byansi,The Honourablez and Mistakes Galz Do that air on NTV and Pearl Magic. In 2019, she produced her first film Kemi in which she stars as herself as the titular character of her own production company, Faisha Pictures International. She has been nominated for Best actress in TV drama for The Honourablez

Kyomuhangi launched her debut album titled Onsiibya mu Ssanyu in August 2006 at Grand Imperial Hotel.

== Personal life ==
Aisha Kyomuhangi is a mother of two and is married.

== Filmography ==
=== Film ===
- Kemi - The Final Tragedy(2019)

=== Stage ===
- Embagga ya Kony
- Ekijjomanyi (The Mosquitoes)
- Enyana Ekutudde
- Ndiwulira

== Television ==
- The Honourablez

== Discography ==
- Onsiibya Mussanyu
- Wenga (2010)
- Kanelage (2010) ft. Miss Vanilla
- Sili fala (2012)
- Ma Sheri (2018)

== Awards and nominations ==
=== Nominations ===
- Best New artist- 2002 Pearl of Africa Music Awards (PAM)
- Best actress in TV drama - The Honourablez
