= Coffee Shop (TV series) =

Ugandan dramatic television series

- Coffee Shop poster
- Genre: Drama, sitcom
- Created by: Patricia Achiro Olwoch
- Written by: Patricia Achiro Olwoch
- Directed by: Mukeera Dennis Josiah
- Starring: Papa Daniel Mushikoma; Pamela Keryeko; Tania Shakira Kankindi; Muhereza Arnold; Debbie Bakuseka; Denis Kinani
- Country of origin: Uganda
- Original language: English
- No. of seasons: 2
- No. of episodes: 13 List of episodes

Production
- Camera setup: Multiple-camera setup
- Running time: 30 minutes
- Production company: Vision Group

Original release
- Network: Urban TV Uganda
- Release: 1 December 2015 – January 2018

The Coffee Shop is a Ugandan drama television series written by Patricia Achiro Olwoch directed by Mukeera Dennis Josiah. The first season premiered on Urban TV Uganda on 1 December 2015 and aired Sundays at 7 pm. The second season premiered on Urban TV Uganda on 8 January 2017. The series was awarded Best TV Series 2016 at UFF2016.

== Plot ==
Mrs. Muturi, a coffee shop owner, takes an interest in the lives of four regular customers, Lisa, Christine, Monica, and Adam, after they help her through a bad week. Mrs. Muturi's relationship with the widower Mr. Tendo is also a part of the show.

== Production ==
The Coffee Shop is a Vision Group production.

== Cast ==
- Mrs Muturi - owner of the coffee shop, originally from Kenya, trying to make a living in Kampala, Uganda
- Mr. Alex Tendo
- Tania Shakirah Kankindi - Lisa
- Monica
- Allan
- Mike

== Awards and nominations ==
Awards and nominations
Year	Award	Category	Received by	Result	Ref
2017	Uganda Film Festival Awards (UFF)	Best TV Drama	Davidson Mugume	Nominated	
2017	Uganda Film Festival Awards (UFF)	Best Actress in a TV Drama	Regina Amoding	Nominated	
2016	Uganda Film Festival Awards (UFF)	Best TV Drama	Mukeera Dennis Joshia	Won	
2016	Uganda Film Festival Awards (UFF)	Best Actor in a TV Drama	Arnold Muhereza	Won	
2016	Uganda Film Festival Awards (UFF)	Best Actress in a TV Drama	Pamela Keryeko	Won	
2016	Uganda Film Festival Awards (UFF)	Best Actress in a TV Drama	Regina Amoding	Nominated	
