= Sarah Kisawuzi =

Ugandan actress (born 1953)

Sarah Kisauzi
- Born: Sarah kisauzi Ssentongo; 11 November 1953 (age 72)
- Citizenship: Ugandan
- Occupation: Actress
- Years active: 2013–present
- Father: Washington Ssentongo
- Awards: Full list

Sarah Ssentongo Kisauzi is a Ugandan actress most known for her role as Nalweyiso, the mean mother-in-law, in the 2013 NTV television drama series Deception.

== Career ==
Mrs. Kisauzi came into the limelight as Nalweyiso, a role she played in a drama series Deception from 2013 to 2016 and won her the Best Actress award at the 2015 Uganda Entertainment Awards. She later played other roles such as in the Disney chess film Queen of Katwe as Katende's grandmother in 2016, Ugandan telenovela Second Chance. She played Mama Stella in a 2019 gender based violence campaign film Bed of Thorns and as Barbara Batte in a 2019 television drama series Power of Legacy. Mrs. Kisauzi has also starred in Usama Mukwaya’s 2012 short film Smart Attempt, and in Mariam Ndagire’s productions Because of you, Hearts in Pieces (2009) and Where we Belong (2011). It was announced in that Mrs. Kisauzi got a role in a Hollywood production titled "Little America"

== Filmography ==
Film
Year	Title	Role	Notes
2023	Ssekukkulu	Mama	Family / Comedy / Drama
2022	Bedroom Chains	Natasha's Mother	Drama
2020	Dance with Valentino		TV Series
2019	Bed of Thorns	Mama Stella	Drama
2019	Power of Legacy	Barbara Batte	2019 Ongoing television series
2016	Queen of Katwe	Katende’s Grandmother	
2016	Second Chance		2016–2018 television series
2013	Deception	Nalweyiso	Won Best Actress at Uganda Entertainment Awards 2015
2012	Smart Attempt		Directed by Usama Mukwaya
2011	Where We Belong		Mariam Ndagire production
2009	Because of You		
2009	Hearts in Pieces		Drama
2020	Men in suits	Amanda	Directed by Nabukenya Kevin Johns

== Awards and nominations ==
Year	Nominated work	Association	Category	Result	Ref.
2016	Deception	Uganda Film Festival Awards	Best Actress in a TV Drama	Nominated	
2015	Deception	Uganda Entertainment Awards	Best Actress	Won	
