= Maureen Nankya =

Ugandan actress (born 1988)

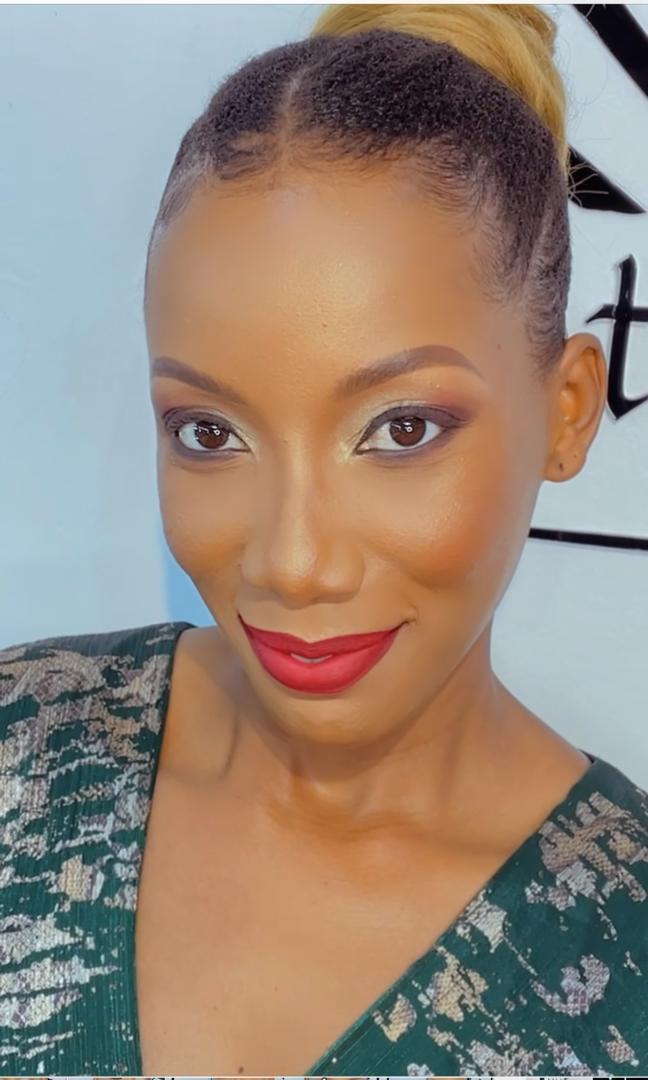
- Nankya at the 2022 Uganda Film Festival
- Born: 17 September 1988 (age 37); Uganda
- Education: Gombe SSS and Kingstone High School, Kawempe in Kampala
- Occupation: Actress

Maureen Nankya is a Ugandan actress who featured in Mariam Ndagire's maiden film Down This Road I Walk (2007) plus sitcom Tendo Sisters which was run on NTV Uganda, Bukedde TV and Maisha Magic. She is also a model, singer, TV presenter, fitness instructor and personal trainer at her startup called Mona Fitness.

== History ==
Born on 17 September 1988, Maureen studied at Gombe SSS and Kingstone High School Kawempe in Kampala. She played the role of Kanini, a mason's wife cheating on her husband with his boss in a Maisha Film Lab project entitled The Casual (2008 short film) written and directed by Kenyan Mark Mutahi. She later appeared on a Warid billboard in the early 2010s. In 2019, she appeared as a gym instructor in a TV commercial for MTN alongside Uganda's Mr. Google. Nankya has featured in various movies including The Life (2012 film) directed by Nana Kagga where she plays Anna, City of Dust (2014 film) where she plays Suzan, a girl with weird dreams and The Athlete (2016), a TV drama by Matt Bish. Maureen also sings and her music has been broadcast on East Africa TV (Channel 5) from Tanzania plus WBS, the first privately owned Ugandan TV station that started in 1999 but was sold off to Zimbabwean tycoon Strive Masiyiwa (Kwese Sports) in 2016. She has worked as a unit production manager on some films and was assistant location manager on the FESPACO award-winning film The Mercy of the Jungle directed by Joel Karekezi in 2017. On 6 September 2019, her talkshow called The Reel where she interviews people in the film industry started airing on Uganda Broadcasting Corporation (UBC TV), Uganda's national broadcaster. She is the creator and producer of the 30 minute program. In the same year, she directed and produced a TV series entitled The Office which premiered on Top Television during the COVID-19 Ugandan lockdown.
