= Cleopatra Koheirwe =

Ugandan actress (born 1982)

- Born: 15 January 1982 (age 44)
- Education: Makerere University; University of South Africa
- Occupations: Actress; radio host; writer
- Years active: 1999–present
- Children: 1
- Awards: Radio & Television Academy Awards (RTVAA) Uganda, 2013
- Presenting career
- Show: Mid-Morning Magazine
- Station: Radiocity 97FM
- Time slot: 10am – 3pm
- Style: Music, celebrity gossip, news, film
- Country: Uganda

Cleopatra Koheirwe is a Ugandan actress, writer, singer, and media personality. She plays Ebony in the new Nana Kagga directed and produced series Reflections alongside other Uganda celebrities Malaika Nnyanzi, Housen Mushema, Andrew Kyamagero, Prynce Joel Okuyo and Gladys Oyenbot.

Koheirwe joined StarTimes Uganda in June 2019 as the new Public Relations Manager.

== Career ==
=== Musical artist (since 2001) ===
In 2001, she joined a popular music, dance and drama group known as Obsessions (now Obsessions Africa) until March 2007 when she resigned from the group to pursue other interests.

In 2010, she started working on her solo singing career. Her first single titled Ngamba (Luganda for "Tell me") was a pop song about deceptive relationships. The song was well received and given airplay on a few of radio stations in Uganda.

=== Radio host (since 2003) ===
In 2013, while still at Radiocity 97Fm, she became a co-host of the U-Request show. She took a maternity break in December 2013 and went to Kenya. In October 2016, she resumed working at Radiocity as a co-host of the Mid-Morning Magazine with Peace Menya until the end of May 2019 when she moved to StarTimes.

=== Television ===
==== Television judge (2011–2013) ====
In September 2013, Cleopatra joined Flavia Tumusiime and Tusker Project Fame judge and singer Juliana Kanyomozi as audition judges for Tusker Project Fame 6 in Kampala.

=== Actress ===
==== Film and television ====
In 2006 Cleopatra auditioned for her first screen acting role for The Last King of Scotland in 2006 in which she played a character named Joy. She has since appeared in a number of film and television productions locally and internationally as well as winning nominations for some of the productions. She has worked on Changes, an M-Net TV series, in seasons 1 and 2 in a supporting role as Nanziri Mayanja from 2008 to 2010, Be the Judge, a Kenyan local TV series as Lucy Mango in 2010, Yogera (2011) playing a double lead role and State Research Bureau (S.R.B) (2011) in a supporting role as Faith Katushabe.

She also worked in Kona, an M-Net TV series where she plays Jakki, a wannabe boxer trying to reconnect with her father, a boxing coach. She appeared in Sense8, a Netflix Original Series as Mother. Cleopatra is set to appear in the new Nana Kagga directed TV series Reflections as Ebony, one of the main four protagonists of the series.

=== Motivational work ===
Still in 2012, she was chosen by Reach a Hand Uganda (RAHU), an NGO that aims at empowering the youth, to speak to youths in various schools. After completing the school tours, RAHU commended her as 'Mentor of the Week'. Cleopatra was one of the first cultural icons at Reach a Hand Uganda (RAHU) and was actively involved until 2014 when she had to take a break from work to raise her baby.

== Personal life ==
Cleopatra was the only child born to Jocelyn Twinesanyu "Sanyu" Rwekikiga and Anthony Abamwikirize Bateyo in 1982. Her father died prior to her birth and her mother died when she was 15. Cleopatra has a daughter who was born in 2014 with boyfriend Lwanda Jawar, a Kenyan actor, model, and stunts director/coordinator. She delivered a baby girl named Aviana Twine Jawar on 22 January 2014. She named her daughter Twine after her mother Twinesanyu.

== Filmography ==
Year	Film/TV Series	Role	Notes
2021	Prestige	Eunice Samula Kintu	TV series showing on Pearl Magic Prime
2021	Juniors Drama Club (JDC)	Teacher Gabriella	TV series directed by Allan Manzi
2019	Kyaddala	Rahu Counselor	A Reach a Hand Uganda and Emmanuel Ikubese Films production on NBS
2018	#Family	Leah	Nabwiso Films TV series.
2018	Mela	Naava Katende	Savannah MOON Web Series
2018	27 Guns	Alice Kaboyo	Natasha Museveni Directed film
2017	Reflections	Ebony	Upcoming TV series created and directed by Nana Kagga Macpherson
2016	Sense8	Mother	TV series created & directed by The Wachowskis
2013	Kona	Jakki	Kenyan telenovela
2011	State Research Bureau	Faith Katushabe	supporting role
2011	Yogera	Hope/ G	double lead
2010	Be the Judge	Lucy Mango	a Kenyan local TV series
2008-10	Changes	Nanziri Mayanja	a Kenyan DSTV series in seasons 1 & 2 in a supporting role
2006	The Last King of Scotland	Joy	supporting role

== Nominations and awards ==
Awards
Year	Award	Category	Work	Result
2021	Uganda Film Festival Awards	Best Actress in TV Drama	Prestige	Nominated
2013	RTV Awards	Best Newcomer female radio presenter	Radiocity FM	Nominated
2013	Nile Diaspora's International Film Festival (NDIFF)	Outstanding Actress	Honoree Award	Honoured with the Industry Maverick Award
2013	Radio & Television Academy Awards (RTVAA) Uganda	Best Late Afternoon Show-English	The Jam on Radiocity 97Fm	Won
2013	Buzz Teeniez Awards	Teeniez Role Model		Nominated
2012	Super Talent Awards	Most Gifted Actress		Nominated
2012	Pearl International Film Festival Awards (PIFFA) Uganda	Best Supporting Actress	State Research Bureau	Nominated
2011	Kalasha Film & Television Awards, Kenya	Best Actress in a TV Drama	Be the Judge	Nominated
