= NTV Akawungeezi =

Uganda's daily news programme

NTV Akawungeezi is NTV Uganda's daily news programme, which is delivered in the Luganda language.

== Details ==
Akawungeezi is a television programme in Uganda. It is aired daily, with news anchors who include Shamim Nayiga, Aniwalu Katamba, and Patrick Mukasa; and news reporters including Solomon Kaweesa and Joyce Bagala.

== Ratings ==
According to GeoPoll, the top three Luganda TV new programs that aired during the 7–8 p.m. timeslot were NTV Uganda's Akawungeezi(18% share); Bukedde 1’s Agabutikidde(15% share); and NBS Television's Amasengejje(11%)
