= Power of Legacy =

- Also known as: NTV Power of Legacy
- Genre: Drama
- Created by: Edris Matu Segawa
- Developed by: Edris Matu Segawa. Xena Bantarizah. Jackie Senyondo. Rosemary Nampijja
- Written by: Edris Matu Segawa; Bentzen Kyazze; Daphne Ampiire Ruabaramira
- Directed by: George Kihumbah
- Starring: Tania Shakirah Kankindi; Sarah Kisawuzi; Jonan Kisibo; Michael Wawuyo; Housen Mushema; Milka Irene; Scola Scot
- Music by: Andrew Ahuura
- Ending theme: Nkwagala
- Country of origin: Uganda
- Original language: English
- No. of seasons: 3
- No. of episodes: NA

Production
- Producer: Rosemary Nampijja
- Production locations: Kampala, Uganda
- Editor: Steve Mitendera
- Running time: 45 minutes

Original release
- Network: NTV Uganda
- Release: March 31, 2019 – present

Power of Legacy is a Ugandan drama television series created by Edris Matu Segawa and directed by George Kihumbah. It stars Tania Shakirah Kankindi, Sarah Kisawuzi, Jonan Kisibo, Michael Wawuyo, Housen Mushema as the main cast. The series’ first season premiered on 31 March 2019 on NTV Uganda and the second season premiered September 8, 2019 and aired two episodes per week.

== Plot ==
Mr. Batte, the patriarch of a wealthy family with a hotel business chain in Kampala, has to resign but there are so many contenders to replace him. Meanwhile, the family must preserve its empire and bond as each member is caught in a web of murder, betrayal, search for love and social prejudice. They have to protect the family's legacy.

== Cast ==
Actor	Character	Seasons		
Actor	Character	1	2	3
Michael Wawuyo	Zacharias Batte SR	Main	Recurring	
Sarah Kisawuzi	Barbara Batte	Main	Main	
Jonan Brian Kisibo	Zack Batte Junior	Main	Main	
Tania Shakirah Kankindi	Rachael Nnakatte	Main	Main	
Housen Mushema	Ben Ssali	Recurring	Main	
Hussein Marijan	Craig Newton	Main	Recurring	
Albert Bagabe	Alex Mutoni	Main	Main	
Scola Scot	Sandra Atwooki	Main	Main	
Selin Audo	Betty	Main	Main	
Michael Musoke	Ahuura Mugabe	Main	Main	
Milka Irene	Fifi Aripa	Main	Main	
Symon Base Kalema	Jengo Paul	Guest	Main	
Diana Kahunde	Prisca	Main	Recurring	
Mark Kilama	Steve Gerald Ssozi	Recurring	Recurring	
Kabenge Richard Valentino	Otim		Recurring	
Pamela Keryeko	Nicholette Atwiine	Recurring	Recurring	
Sarafina Muhawenimana	Maggie	Recurring	Recurring	

== Series overview ==
Season	Episodes	Originally aired	
Season	Episodes	First aired	Last aired
1	24	31 March 2019	17 June 2019
2	24	8 September 2019	25 November 2019
3	24	6 July 2020	TBA
