= Etania Mutoni =

Ugandan DJ

- Born: Edith Ndagire
- Other name: Life of the Party
- Occupations: DJ, media personality, radio presenter, television presenter, master of ceremonies
- Years active: 2020–present
- Known for: NTV Dance Party, NRG Radio Uganda, Becoming Life of the Party

Edith Ndagire (born August 25), professionally known as Forever Etania and Etania Mutoni, is a Ugandan DJ, media personality, radio presenter, television host, master of ceremonies (MC), and social media influencer.

She rose to prominence during the COVID-19 lockdown period in Uganda through her appearances on NTV Dance Party, which became one of the country's most popular entertainment programmes during restrictions on public gatherings.

Etania became known nationally during the lockdown period through her presentation style and audience engagement on television. Following her television work, she expanded into radio broadcasting, event hosting, brand partnerships, and professional deejaying, becoming one of Uganda's recognizable young entertainment personalities.

In April 2026, she headlined Becoming Life of the Party, a major entertainment showcase held at Lugogo Hockey Grounds in Kampala.

== Early life ==
Before entering mainstream media, Etania worked in Kampala's nightlife and entertainment industry. She was associated with the events and marketing collective Muchachos, where she worked as a hostess and developed skills in audience engagement and live entertainment.

Prior to gaining national recognition, she worked various jobs within the hospitality and entertainment sectors while pursuing opportunities in media and events.

== Career ==
=== Television career ===
Etania gained national recognition in 2020 when she joined NTV Dance Party, a music and entertainment programme launched during the COVID-19 lockdown period. The programme attracted large audiences and contributed to her rise .

In later interviews, she stated that both NTV Uganda and NBS Television had approached her during the lockdown period, but she chose to join NTV Uganda.

Following her television work , she on roles in event hosting, commercial endorsements and entertainment appearances.

=== Radio career ===
Following her television presence, Etania joined NRG Radio Uganda, where she hosted entertainment programming and became one of the station's notable on-air personalities.

In April 2026, she announced her departure from NRG Radio through social media.

=== DJ career ===
Alongside her television and radio work, Etania developed a professional career as a DJ. She transitioned from event hosting and media presentation into live DJ performances across Uganda and East Africa.

Her growth as a DJ coincided with the increasing visibility of female DJs within Uganda's entertainment industry.

== Brand partnerships ==
Etania has worked with several brands operating within Uganda's entertainment and lifestyle sectors. She has been associated with Smirnoff Uganda and has appeared in promotional campaigns and entertainment events organized by the brand.

== Personal life ==
Etania's relationship with Ugandan singer Joshua Baraka.
