= Vampino =

Ugandan musical artist

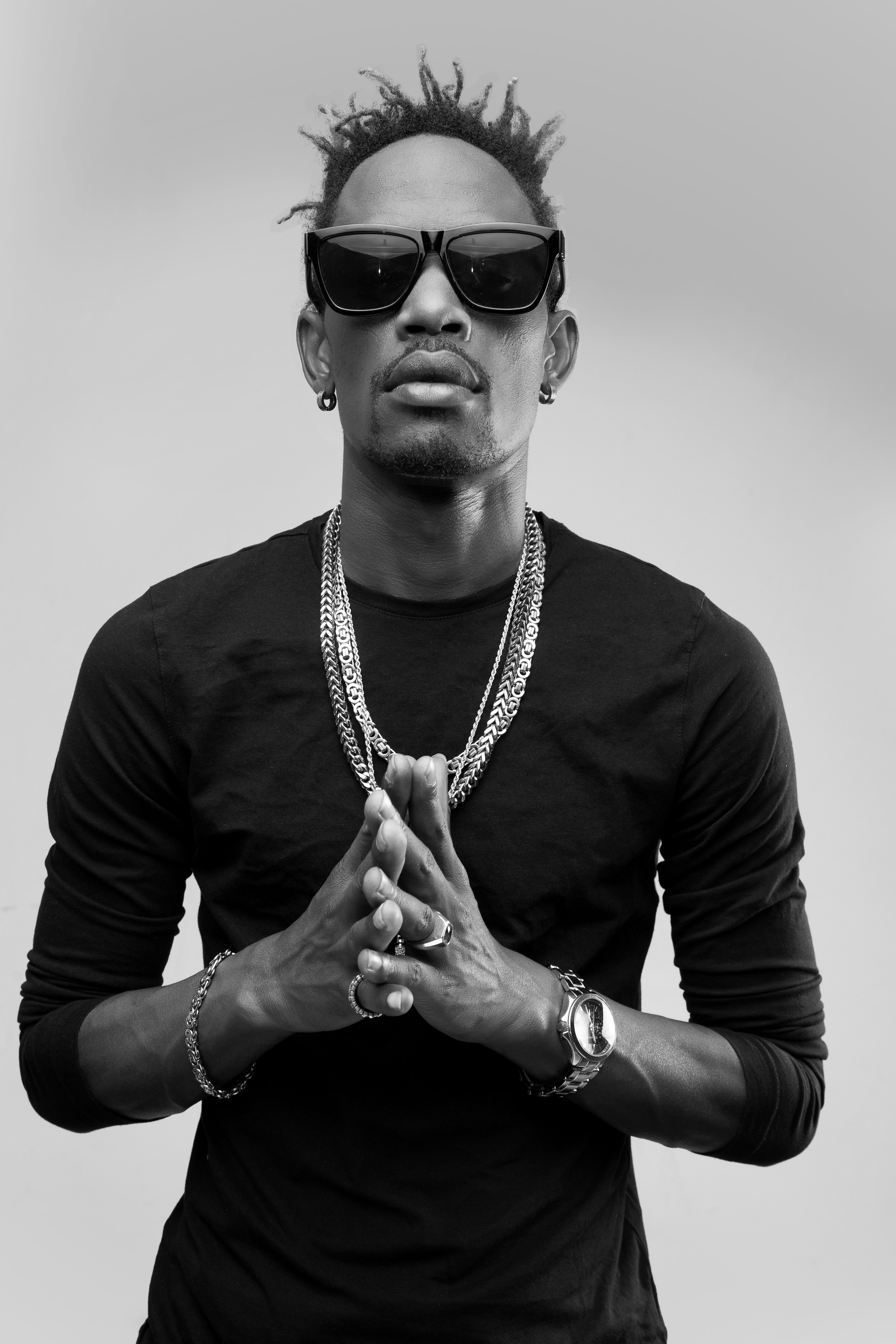
- Born: 1980 (age 45–46); Uganda
- Citizenship: Uganda
- Education: Shimoni Primary school, Kabojja International school and Namasagali secondary school, Aptech computer school.
- Occupation: musician
- Known for: Reggea and Dancehall music in Uganda.
- Relatives: Maurice Kirya (Brother)
- Musical career
- Genre: Reggae
- Instrument: Vocals
- Years active: 2000–present
- Label: Swangz Avenue

Vampino, born Elvis Kirya, is a Ugandan dance hall musician and actor who began his career in the early 2000s debuting his acting career in Nana Kagga's 2012 film, The life. He was one half of the duo "Benon and Vamposs." He is a brother to musician Maurice Kirya. He is signed to Swangz Avenue.

== Early life and education ==
Vampino was born in 1980. He attended Shimoni Primary School, Kabojja and Namasagali Secondary before joining Aptech where he attained a diploma in Computer Networking and Maintenance.

== Music ==
Vampino first made his name under a music duo Benon and Vamposs. The duo started doing music in 2000. The duo had successful songs like "Mumulete", "I know", "Nsazewo", and "My lady". The video for their song "Mumuleete" made it to the top ten on MTV chart in UK. In 2009, Vampino opted for a solo career as Benon Mugumbya concentrated on music production. He has had a successful solo career with songs like "Kwekunyakunya" ft Keko (rapper), Juliana Kanyomozi and Cinderella Sanyu and "Tell it" with Radio and Weasle. He has also collaborated with R&B singer Nick Nola on songs like "Nobody Like Me" and "Setula".

He has worked with artists such as Jamaican Dancehall star such as Elephant man, Maurice Kirya, Sheebah Karungi, Radio and weasel and many more.

== Discography ==
=== Songs ===
1. Linda
2. Kuwaako
3. Love to Dance
4. Ninga Akumanyi
5. Njela Njela
6. Harambe
7. Mabanja
8. Smart Wire
9. Kimuli
10. Wanji
11. Tombowa
12. Mpenzi
13. Byemere
14. Mikonkome
15. Come Wine
16. Reality Love
17. Kwekunyakunya
18. Tell It
19. Fire
20. Nyongera
21. Wepanse
22. Uganda
23. Ngoma
24. Money
25. Tackle U
26. Whine For Me
27. Kakoola
28. Don't Say That
29. Vibes
30. Kiwundo Anthem
31. Xtra Bango
32. Wyne 4 Me
33. Lwaki Okaaba
34. Flossing
35. Kyakala Dance
36. Smile
37. A Wah Do Dem
38. Locomotive

=== Benon and Vamposs ===
- Extra, Extra Large, 2007

== Filmography ==
- 2012 The Life as Smokey Luciano
