= Deedan Muyira =

Ugandan actress

- Born: Kenya
- Education: Namasagali University, UMCAT
- Occupations: Radio/TV Personality, Actress
- Presenting career
- Show: The Jam, Radiocity
- Station: Radiocity
- Time slot: 3pm–7pm
- Show: Urban Today, Urban TV
- Station: Urban TV
- Time slot: 8am–10am
- Style: News, Entertainment, Fun
- Country: Uganda
- Previous shows
- Occupations: Radio Presenter, TV Host, Actress
- Years active: 2013–present
- Known for: Beneath The Lies

Diana Deedan Muyira (commonly referred to as just Deedan or Miss Deedan), is a Ugandan actress and media personality, known for playing the role of Tracy Kintu in Nana Kagga’s Beneath The Lies. Deedan was born in Kenya and moved to Uganda to work.

== Career ==
Deedan has been the host of Kampala’s biggest music festival, Blankets and Wine since its inception. She has hosted many other events including Tokosa Food Fest. Deedan is a radio presenter on Radiocity Kampala and hosts, with her counterpart McKenzie, The Jam, an evening drive show which features music and information for Kampala.

She joined the Urban Today show in 2016 after the departure of Gaetano Kagwa. In 2014, Deedan debuted her acting career on Beneath The Lies, playing Tracy Kintu, a woman from a rich family who faces domestic abuse from her husband.

== Filmography ==
=== Television series ===
Year	TV Series	Role	Notes
2021	Sanyu	Atwine	created by Matthew Nabwiso
2014	Beneath the Lies - The Series	Tracy Kintu	created by Nana Kagga Macpherson

== See also ==
- Flavia Tumusiime
- Nana Kagga
- Gaetano Kagwa
