= Uganda Film Festival Award for Best Actress in a Television Drama =

Category of film award

- Awarded for: Excellence in Cinematic Acting Achievement
- Country: Uganda
- Presented by: Uganda Communications Commission (UCC)
- First award: 2016

The Uganda Film Festival Award for Best Actress in a Television Drama is an award presented annually by Uganda Communications Commission (UCC) to a female actor (actress) for their outstanding acting in a television drama series in Uganda at the Uganda Film Festival Awards

== Winners and nominees ==
The table shows the winners and nominees for the Best Actress in a Television Drama award.

Table key
indicates the winner

Year	Actress	Television	Ref.
2016 (4th)	Pamela Karyeko	Coffee Shop	
2016 (4th)	Regina Amoding	Coffee Shop	
2016 (4th)	Sarah Kisawuzi	Deception	
2016 (4th)	Pretty Katende	Deception	
2017 (5th)	Rehema Nanfuka	Yat Madit	
2017 (5th)	Hellen Lukoma	Mistakes Girls Do	
2017 (5th)	Regina Amoding	Coffee Shop	
2018 (6th)	Nantambi Juliet	Mistakes Girls Do	
2018 (6th)	Dianah Nabatanzi	Mistakes Girls Do	
2018 (6th)	The Villain Woman	Taste of Time	
2018 (6th)	Fiona Birungi	Taste of Time	
2018 (6th)	Teddy Adungo	Live Your Dreams	
2019 (7th)	Eleanor Nabwiso	#Family	
2019 (7th)	Allen Musumba	Half London	
2019 (7th)	Aisha Kyomuhangi	The Honourables	
2019 (7th)	Juliet Nantambi	Mistakes Girls Do	
2019 (7th)	Beatrice Mirembe	Abigail	
2021 (8th)	Nana Kagga	Prestige	
2021 (8th)	Cleopatra Koheirwe	Prestige	
2021 (8th)	Phiona Sebandeke	What If	
2021 (8th)	Joan Agaba	What If	
2021 (8th)	Tracy Kababiito	Sanyu	
2021 (8th)	Hawart Nasaasi	Mistakes Girls Do	

== Multiple wins and nominations ==
No actress has received multiple wins for this category.

Nominations	Actress
2	Regina Amoding
2	Juliet Nantambi

Some televisions series have received multiple nominations in this category as seen below.

Nominations	Television Series
3	Coffee Shop
3	Mistakes Girls Do
2	Deception
2	Taste of Time
