= The Honourables =

Ugandan television series

- Genre: Drama
- Starring: Hellen Lukoma; Symon Base Kalema; Aisha Kyomuhangi; Philip Luswata; Malaika; Doreen Mirembe; Candy Mutesi; Patricko Mujuuka; Stecia Mayanja
- Opening theme: The Honourables
- Country of origin: Uganda
- Original language: English
- No. of seasons: 21

Production
- Production location: Kampala
- Camera setup: Multi-camera
- Running time: 45 minutes
- Production company: NTV Uganda

Original release
- Network: NTV Uganda; Pearl Magic
- Release: 9 January 2017 – present

The Honourables is a Ugandan political satire-drama series that premiered on NTV Uganda on 9 January 2017, starring Hellen Lukoma, Symon Base Kalema, Aisha Kyomuhangi, Philip Luswata, Malaika, Doreen Mirembe, Candy Mutesi, Patricko Mujuuka and singer Stecia Mayanja. The series which was also later picked up by Pearl Magic in 2018 exposes the vices of MPs and other government officials who frequent a local bar in Kampala, showing their greed, corruption, adultery and many other vices.

== Awards ==
Awards & Nominations
Year	Award	Category	Received by	Result	Ref
2017	Uganda Entertainment Awards	Best TV Series		Won	
2017	Uganda Entertainment Awards	Best actress	Doreen Mirembe	Nominated	
2017	Uganda Entertainment Awards	Best actress	Hellen Lukoma	Won	
2017	Uganda Entertainment Awards	Best actress	Mutesi Candy	Nominated	
2019	Uganda Film Festival Awards	Best TV Drama		Nominated	
2019	Uganda Film Festival Awards	Best Actress in TV Drama	Aisha Kyomuhangi	Nominated	
2019	Uganda Film Festival Awards	Best Actor in a TV Drama	Patrick MuJuuka	Nominated	
