= NTV Uganda =

Ugandan television station

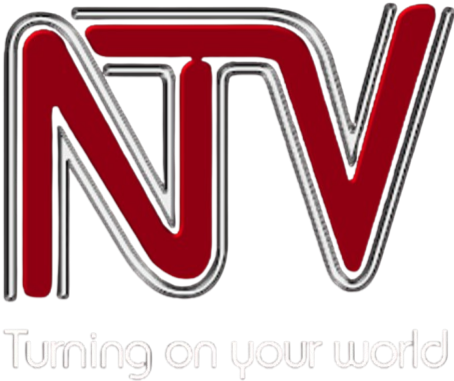
- Logo since 2006
- Branding: NTV Uganda
- Country: Uganda
- Availability: National
- Founded: 6 December 2006; 19 years ago by Nation Media Group
- Motto: Turning on your world
- Headquarters: Serena, Kampala, Uganda
- Parent: NTV Kenya
- Launch date: December 6, 2006
- Picture format: 720p (HDTV)
- Affiliates: Spark Tv
- Official website: ntv.co.ug
- Language: English

NTV Uganda is a Ugandan television station under the Nation Media Group (NMG), operating in East Africa. It has been on air since 2006. It is one of the companies owned by Aga Khan IV.

During the Arua Municipality by-election, NTV Uganda reporter Herbert Zziwa and cameraman Ronald Muwanga were arrested on allegations of inciting violence. It was also banned from covering aerial footage of National Resistance Movement rallies in the 2016 general elections.

In 2020 the media house reached one million followers on Twitter.

The company is among the most followed companies on Twitter, Facebook and YouTube. It currently has over 2,600,000 followers.

According to GeoPoll, together with NBS, they got higher COVID-19 lockdown viewership.

In 2014, it was alleged that NTV Uganda wanted to buy NBS Television.

On 28 June 2026, the Uganda People's Defense Forces (UPDF), acting on orders issued by Chief of Defence Forces General Muhoozi Kainerugaba, surrounded Nation Media Group Uganda's premises in Kampala. NTV Uganda, the Daily Monitor, Spark TV, KFM, and Dembe FM were taken off air after military personnel restricted access to the broadcaster's facilities. The incident was condemned by several media freedom organizations and international observers. Nation Media Group entered negotiations with the Ugandan authorities to restore operations.

== Presenters ==
=== Current presenters/hosts ===
1. Solomon Kawesa
2. Frank Walusimbi(Now left)
3. Crysto Panda
4. Aniwal Katamba
5. Lynda Ddane
6. Andrew Kyamagero (Left)
7. Patrick Mukasa
8. Mc Esco
9. Sandra Nakiwala
10. Sandra Kahumuza
11. Sammy Wetala
12. Rita Kanya
13. Raymond Mujuni
14. Romeo Busiku
15. Just Gystin
16. Patrick Kamara
17. Etania Mutoni

=== Former presenters/hosts ===
1. Joel Ssenyonyi
2. Agnes Nandutu
3. Flavia Tumusiime
4. Maurice Mugisha
5. Arnold Segawa
6. Frank Walusimbi
7. Faridah Nakazibwe
8. Hatma Naluggwa Ssekaaya
9. Joel Khamadi

== Programming ==
=== News ===
- National
- NTV Akawungeezi
- NTV Tonight
- International
- Business
- Sports
- Science & Tech
- SparkTV News

=== Shows ===
- Fourth Estate
- Panorama
- Seeds of Gold
- Tuwaye
- PWJK
- Men
- NTV Travel
- Log In
- NTV Travel
- Comedicine
- Choices
- Sweet Treats
- The Property Show
- On The Spot
- Mwasuze Mutya
- The Beat
- The Link
- NTV Dance Party
- Comedy Store Uganda

=== Drama ===
Title	First broadcast	Last broadcast
Power of Legacy	2019	Ongoing
#Family	2018	2018
The Honourables	2017	Ongoing
Second Chance	2016	2018
Yat Madit	2016	2017
Deception	2013	2016
The Hostel	2011	2015
Tendo Sisters	2009	2012
Choices	2025	2025
