= Sesanga Jerry =

Ugandan writer

- Born: 1994 (age 31–32); Kampala, Uganda
- Education: Makerere University
- Alma mater: (St Balikuddembe Secondary School) (Uganda Certificate of Education) (London College Nansana) (Uganda Advanced Certificate of Education); St Lawrence University (Bachelor in Mass Communication)
- Occupations: Writer, movie director
- Writing career
- Genres: Fiction, poetry, narrative
- Website: www.sesangajerry.com

Sesanga Jerry or sometimes spelt Ssesanga Jerry (born 1994) is a Ugandan writer, movie director and author based in the United States. During the 10th Ugandan Film Festival, his movie The Tales Of Our Times was nominated as the Best Film in Indigenous Language category. He is also the Director of the 2023 Seeta High's Against My Dreams.

Further more, Sesanga is the Executive Producer of Multichoice's cooking show Mum Vs Wife Uganda which premiered on 14 April 2024 on Pearl Magic Prime, on DSTV and GOTV.

In May 2023, Jerry Sesanga was commissioned by Mnet to work on his idea, “The Lions of Buganda” set in 1600 precolonial Uganda. The film became multichoice Uganda's biggest ever production in terms of Budget. It was also shot 70% on green screen becoming Uganda's first mostly green screen feature film it premiered on 31st December on both Pearl Magic Prime and Pearl Magic.

During the 11th Uganda Film Festival, Sesanga's film, The Lions of Buganda was nominated 10 times including Best Film and Best Director. It won three awards becoming the second biggest film of the night. It won Best Make up, Best Costume Design and Best Indigenous Language Film. The winners included 10 millions in cash and 20 millions worth of travel to Toronto International Film Festival.

== Early life and education ==
Sesanga was born in Kampala to Rogers Ssessanga and Terry Namubiru. He attended Frobell Kindergarten, St Catherine Primary School and completed his primary education at Kikaaya Primary School in Bulenga. He went on to join St Balikuddembe Secondary School for his O-level and sat for his final exams at London College Nansana in 2011. In 2012, he enrolled at Makerere University, pursuing a degree in education with Literature and English. In December 2017, he graduated with a bachelor's degree in Mass Communication from St Lawrence University.

== Career ==
Sesanga has worked as a journalist for various media houses in Uganda, like Daily Monitor, as a writer and reporter. Since 2020, Sesanga has directed various movies like The Run (2020), The African Dream (2022), The Tale of Our Times (2023), Against My Dreams (2023), The Pearl Magic Cooking show Mum Vs Wife not forgetting the Three Award-winning serrie; The Lions Of Buganda currently screening on Pearl Magic.

=== Published work ===
- "Primary School Poetry": A child's Inner voice, (December 28, 2013) ISBN 1491212616,
- Voices from Jali.: The African story has just gotten better, ISBN 1492811378
- African Girl Paperback
- Princess of Africa: A fairy tale inspired by the brothers Grimm
- Redrawing a new Africa Paperback, ISBN 978-1499364880.
