= Mistakes Girls Do =

Ugandan television series

- Genre: Drama series
- Created by: Richard Mulindwa
- Starring: Joan Agaba; Mukasa Brandon; Bwanika Baale Felix; Jean Kobusingye Jovitah; Nantambi Juliet; Hellen Lukoma; Doreen Mirembe; Diana Nabantanzi; Doreen Nabbanja; Ninsiima Ronah; Fiona Ssebandeke; Housen Mushema
- Country of origin: Uganda
- Original languages: English; Luganda
- No. of seasons: 10

Production
- Producer: Richard Mulindwa
- Production locations: Kampala, Uganda
- Cinematography: Rhonnie Nkalubo Abraham; Rwamusigazi Kyakunzire
- Editor: Richard Mulindwa
- Production companies: Limit Productions; TAMZ Production

Original release
- Network: Pearl Magic
- Release: 15 June 2017 – 2017

Mistakes Girls Do, also stylized as Mistakes Gals Do, is a Ugandan drama television series created and produced by Richard Mulindwa under the Limit Productions banner. The series which had been running as a web series since its release in 2017 was picked up by Pearl Magic network when it started operating in 2018. The series is about the lives of young women, the mistakes they make in their lives, the consequences they face and the lessons they learn.

== Cast ==
- Bwanika Baale Felix
- Joan Agaba as Kate
- Mukasa Brandon as James
- Jean Kobusingye Jovitah
- Nantambi Juliet as Lisa
- Hellen Lukoma as Zoey
- Doreen Mirembe
- Diana Nabantanzi
- Doreen Nabbanja as Rachael
- Ninsiima Ronah as Tarsha
- Fiona Ssebandeke as Joviah
- Housen Mushema as Ian
- Morris Mugisha as Kevin

== Awards ==
Awards & Nominations
Year	Award	Category	Received by	Result	Ref
2019	Uganda Film Festival Awards	Best TV Drama		Nominated	
2019	Uganda Film Festival Awards	Best actress in TV Drama	Juliet Nantambi	Nominated	
2018	Uganda Film Festival Awards	Best TV Drama		Won	
2018	Uganda Film Festival Awards	Best Actress in TV Drama	Juliet Nantambi	Won	
2018	Uganda Film Festival Awards	Best Actress in TV Drama	Diana Nabatanzi	Nominated	
2018	Uganda Film Festival Awards	Best Actor in a TV Drama	Jay (Play Boy)	Nominated	
2017	Uganda Film Festival Awards	Best TV Drama		Nominated	
