= The Life (2012 film) =

Ugandan drama film

- Theatrical release poster
- Directed by: Nana Kagga
- Written by: Nana Kagga
- Produced by: Nana Kagga; Meme Kagga
- Starring: Maureen Nankya; Gasuza Lwanga; Iryn Naddamba; Elvis ‘Vamposs’ Kirya (Vampino); Susan Nava; Boxa Franklin; Tibba Murungi; Onoh Ozongwu; Paris Shyla; Clare Senkusa
- Cinematography: Gasuza Lwanga
- Edited by: Ken Heights Sabiiti
- Music by: Ruyonga
- Production company: Savannah MOON Productions
- Distributed by: M-Net
- Release date: December 19, 2012
- Running time: 90 minutes
- Country: Uganda
- Language: English

The Life is a Ugandan drama feature film created, written and directed by Nana Kagga. The film features Ugandan actors including Gasuza Lwanga, Maureen Nankya, Elvis ‘Vamposs’ Kirya, Tibba Murungi, Susan Nava. M-NET secured film screening rights and the film was shown on its Africa Magic channels.

== Plot ==
The Life is about friendship and betrayal. Set in the Ugandan urban life scene, it tells an interwoven story of a group of 20-something friends from different backgrounds and the extremes they are prepared to go to as they try to achieve their dreams.

== Production ==
The film was shot in Kampala, Uganda. It was Savannah MOON's maiden full-length feature film production and Nana Kagga's writing and directing debut.

== Release ==
M-Net secured film screening rights for The Life. The film was shown on its Africa Magic channels. The soundtrack for the film was sung by Ruyonga, a prominent Ugandan rapper.

== Cast ==
- Maureen Jolly Nankya as Anna, an aspiring musician, girlfriend to Jaguar
- Gasuza Lwanga as Tendo a.k.a. “Jaguar”, a record selling musician at the top of the game, married to Nekesa, boyfriend to Anna
- Iryn Naddamba as Nekesa, Jaguar's wife and best friend to Anna and Priscilla
- Elvis ‘Vamposs’ Kirya) as “Smokey Luciano”, an aspiring musician and Jaguar's former best friend
- Annet Namukassa as Vixen, an established musician and pretty girl
- Susan Nava as Suzan, a TV presenter, a know it all
- Boxa Franklin as Paulo, Jaguar's manager, a shady character, manager to several aspiring musicians including Anna
- Tibba Murungi as Priscilla, Nekesa and Anna's best friend, the sensible one
- Onoh Ozongwu as Vixen's husband
- Paris Shyla as Milly, Anna's sister from the village
- Clare Senkusa as Claire, Nekesa's sister, living with her and Jaguar
- Nassozi as landlady
- James Kyambadde as part of funeral procession
