= Loving Tyra =

Ugandan television series

- Genre: Drama, Musical
- Created by: Denis Dhikusooka Jr.
- Starring: Vivian Kaitesi; Juliet Kobusingye; Denis Dhikusooka Jr.
- Country of origin: Uganda
- Original language: English
- No. of seasons: 1

Production
- Producer: Denis Dhikusooka
- Production locations: Kampala, Uganda
- Running time: 30 minutes
- Production company: Pearl Wonders Entertainment

Original release
- Network: Pearl Magic, Showmax
- Release: February 6, 2020 – present

Loving Tyra is a Ugandan musical drama television series created by Denis Dhikusooka Jr. It stars Vivian Kaitesi as Tyra, a celebrated recording artist who finds herself in a complicated relationship with a conman on the loose. The series premiered on Pearl Magic TV on February 6, 2020, and on Showmax in September 2020. Denis Dhikusooka Jr., who created the series, also plays other roles as the producer and writer as well as playing Mathias, the antagonist of the series.

== Plot ==
Tyra is rich, famous, and has everything, but yearns for love. Her quest for love leads her to a conman named Mathias. When Mathias escapes from prison, he needs a mark to con in order to get money. Tyra becomes his target. She falls in love with him not knowing who he is.

== Cast ==
Cast
Cast Member	Character	Type
Vivian Kaitesi	Tyra	Main
Juliet Kobusingye	Michelle	Main
Denis Dhikusooka Jr.	Mathias	Main
	Allan	Main
