= Reach a Hand Uganda =

Reach a Hand, Uganda
- Abbreviation: RAHU
- Founder: Humphrey Nabimanya
- Type: Non-Profit Organisation
- Purpose: Livelihoods and Skills Development, Sexual Reproductive Health and Rights (SRHR), HIV/AIDS Awareness and Prevention
- Website: reachahand.org

Reach a Hand, Uganda (RAHU) is a youth serving nonprofit organisation based in Uganda that focuses on youth empowerment programs with an emphasis on, Sexual Reproductive Health Rights (SRHR) and Advocacy of young people between the ages of 10–30 years including HIV/AIDS awareness and prevention, and youth livelihood promotion. RAHU works with the goal of increasing access to information and services relating to SRHR for young people so as to empower them live healthy, focused and productive lives. Reach A Hand Uganda's efforts are timely to make a contribution to ensuring that every young person in Uganda can access accurate information to aid and direct them in taking that crucial life decision regarding their life skills and development, and sexual reproductive health and rights.

== Overview ==
Established in 2011, Reach A Hand Uganda draws inspiration from the personal life of Humphrey Nabimanya, the Founder and chief executive officer of the organization. of the organization. Having been raised by HIV positive guardians, Humphrey was exposed to discrimination and stigma at a very early age by his fellow students and school staff who assumed he was HIV positive like his guardians. Through this struggle, he visualized the urgency to address the misconceptions that were caused by the information gap. Humphrey was compelled to educate not only his peers but also other young people about HIV/AIDS. Because of the great conviction and the activities he had engaged in, Humphrey conceptualized the idea of Reach A Hand Uganda, then, as a weekend outreach program to interact and inform other young people about HIV/AIDS. With the increasing need to inform young people about HIV/AIDS, Humphrey expanded RAHU to an officially registered organization in July 2011 as a fully youth immersed organization. Reach A Hand Uganda today, is still a youth fronted and youth concentrated organization focusing on youth empowerment programs with an emphasis on Sexual Reproductive Health and Rights (SRHR), HIV/AIDS awareness and prevention.

== Initiatives ==
=== iKon Awards ===
Nguyen 14

The ikon Initiative is an annual prestigious programme developed by Reach A Hand Uganda that recognises and awards transformational thought leaders and implementers in various fields of social development. The awards are based on 3 extensive facts: Education, Connection and Awards.

=== The Peer Educators Academy ===
The Peer Educators academy is an initiative organised annually by RAHU. It serves as a platform to train and equip young people not only with comprehensive information about Sexual Reproductive Health and Rights but also life and Entrepreneurship skills as well.

=== Intergenerational Dialogue ===
The Intergenerational Dialogue is an annual one-day high level advocacy platform that fosters structured conversations on the Sexual Reproductive Health and Rights (SRHR) issues affecting young Ugandans.

=== Share 101’s ===
Share 101's are an advocacy platform that brings together stakeholders like school administration, policy makers, young people to discuss the actualities of Sexual and Reproductive Health and Rights in Uganda and beyond.

=== SAUTIplus EcoSystem ===
The SAUTIplus initiative is an information channel created by RAHU that combines an interactive web portal and various social media platforms to enlighten youth on information regarding Sexual Reproductive Health and Rights. It provides content about HIV/AIDS awareness and prevention, relationships, life skills, teenage pregnancy, child marriages and sexuality among others.

=== Empowerment through Music ===
The initiative seeks to inspire young people through music and songs laced with SRHR information. The songs and performances under this initiative are carried out by RAHU cultural icons like Geosteady, Mun G, Allan Toniks and Nutty Neithan among others in an effort to inspire and motivate the young people through familiar avenues like music.

=== JAS programme ===
With support from the Swedish International Development Cooperation Agency - SIDA, the Center for Health, Human Rights and Development (CEHURD) with its partners are implementing a programme titled:The Joint Advocacy for Sexual and Reproductive Health and Rights in Uganda (JAS Programme) which aims at building a progressive Sexual Reproductive Health Rights advocacy movement in Uganda.

=== Outreaches ===
Outreaches are activities organised to mobilise people from communities to come for free SRHR information and services. In the different communities, outreaches focus on different SRHR components depending on the project needs. They often have elements of information sharing, service provision and edutainment in the form of games or music.

=== Community Dialogues ===
Community Dialogues are advocacy platforms that bring together various stakeholders in a certain community to discuss an issue that affects young people in the community.

== Partners ==
RAHU works in partnership with the Ministry of Health Uganda and various international organisations and foundations on various youth empowerment programs. Some of RAHU's global partners include UNFPA Uganda, UNESCO, Rutgers, Segal Family Foundation and MTV Staying Alive Foundation among others.
