= Uganda Film Festival Award for Best Actor in a Television Drama =

Category of film award

- Awarded for: Excellence in Cinematic Acting Achievement
- Country: Uganda
- Presented by: Uganda Communications Commission (UCC)
- First award: 2016

The Uganda Film Festival Award for Best Actor in a Television Drama is an award presented annually by Uganda Communications Commission (UCC) to a male actor for their outstanding acting in a television drama series in Uganda at the Uganda Film Festival Awards

== Winners and nominees ==
The table shows the winners and nominees for the Best Actor in a Television Drama award.

Table key
indicates the winner

Year	Actor	Television	Ref.
2016 (4th)	Muhereza Arnold	Coffee Shop	
2016 (4th)	Charles Kabogoza	Deception	
2016 (4th)	Bobby Tamale	It Can't Be	
2016 (4th)	Denis Dhikusooka Jr.	Invasion	
2017 (5th)	Michael Wawuyo Jr.	Yat Madit	
2017 (5th)	Raymond Rushabiro	Mistakes Girls Do	
2017 (5th)	Sam Okello	The Honourables	
2017 (5th)	Fagil Mandy	Second Chance	
2018 (6th)	Ejule Paul	Taste of Time	
2018 (6th)	Jay Playboy	Mistakes Girls Do	
2018 (6th)	Ssengendo Clayment Jones	Mistakes Girls Do	
2018 (6th)	Andrew Kyamagero	Live Your Dreams	
2018 (6th)	Head Boy	Anti Kale	
2019 (7th)	Bwanika Baale Felix	Game of Lies	
2019 (7th)	Patrick MuJuuka	The Honourables	
2019 (7th)	Mathew Nabwiso	#Family	
2019 (7th)	Lukyamuzi James Jaro	Abigail	
2021 (8th)	Raymond Rushabiro	What If	
2021 (8th)	Joel Okuyo Atiku	What If	
2021 (8th)	Olumide Oworu	Kyaddala	
2021 (8th)	Symon Base Kalema	Prestige	
2021 (8th)	Eron Ntuulo	Chapters	

== Multiple wins and nominations ==
Nominations	Television Series
2	Raymond Rushabiro
