= Flavia Tumusiime =

Ugandan actress (born 1989)

Flavia Tumusiime Kabuura
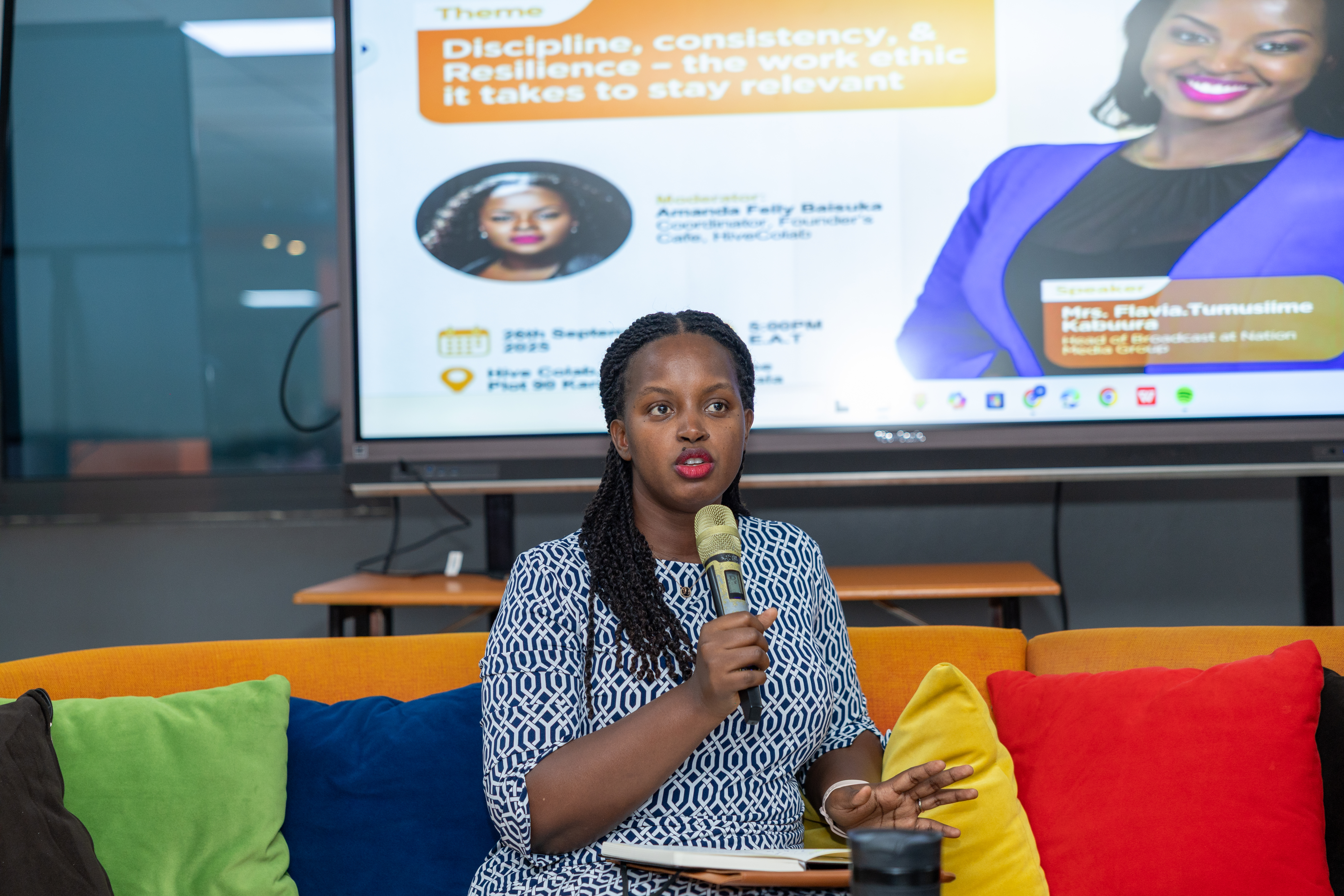
- Tumusiime giving a talk at the Hive collab to entrepreneurs.
- Born: 11 February 1988 (age 38); Uganda
- Education: Makerere University Business School; Cavendish University Uganda
- Occupations: Actress, radio/television host
- Years active: 2006–present
- Known for: 30 Days of Flavia; Beneath the Lies; Kiwani: The Movie
- Spouse: Andrew Kabuura (m. 2019)
- Children: 3
- Awards: Young Achievers Award for Media and Journalism 2013
- Website: www.flaviatumusiime.com

Flavia Tumusiime is a Ugandan actress, media personality, media and tech communications consultant, VJ, radio and television host, voice-over artist, emcee and author of 30 Days of Flavia. She played the lead role of Kamali Tenywa (lead role) in Nana Kagga's television series, Beneath the Lies, from 2014 to 2016. On April 7, 2025 she was announced the new head of broadcasting by National Media Group.

== Early life and education ==
Tumusiime was born in 1988 in Kampala, and is the only child of Enoch Tumusiime and Christine Asiimwe, who hail from Kabale, South Western Uganda. She attended St Theresa Kisubi for primary school, then joined Kitante Hill Secondary School for both "O" and "A" levels. She then attended Makerere University Business School where she graduated with a bachelor's degree in International Business.

== Television ==
Tumusiime has been a television presenter since she was a teenager. She started presenting on WBS TV's Teen's Club, a show she did with other teens for four years. Between 2010 and 2012, she presented K-files, also on WBS TV. Since 2011, she has presented the Guinness Football Challenge. It has been aired on NTV (Uganda) and ITV & KTN (Kenya). In the same period, she was a VJ on Channel O. She was also a presenter for Big Brother Africa in 2012.

Tumusiime joined NTV Uganda as a news anchor on NTV Tonight in 2016. She is a former co-host of the morning show Morning @ NTV, beginning in early 2018.

== Radio ==
Tumusiime had a short stint working as a presenter on HOT100 FM in 2006 before finally settling at Capital FM, where she has worked to date.

== Awards and recognition ==
- Young Achievers Award for Media and Journalism 2013
- Silver award in the best mid-morning show category at the 2013 Radio and TV Awards
- Teeniez role model in 2013 Buzz Teeniez Awards
- Best Dressed Female Media Personality of the Year - Abryanz Style and Fashion Awards 2015
- Best Female Radio Personality - Uganda Entertainment Awards 2016

== Filmography ==
=== Television shows ===
Year	TV show	Role	Notes
2018	Morning @ NTV		Host
2018	NTV Tonight		Anchor
2014	Beneath the lies - The Series	Kamali Tenywa	Lead role, created by Nana Kagga Macpherson
2014	Reserved	Herself - host	Hosting celebrities on her web series
2014	Tusker Twende Kazi	Herself - contestant from Uganda	Celebrity
2013	Tusker Project Fame	Herself - auditions judge	Judge at auditions (Uganda)

=== Film ===
Year	Film	Role	Notes
2010	Irreversable regret		
2008	Kiwani: The Movie	Pam	Played alongside Juliana Kanyomozi as her character's niece

== Personal life ==
Tumusiime married Andrew Kabuura, a sports broadcaster at NBS Television, on January 12, 2019. The couple has three children including a set of twins.
