= Pearl Magic =

Ugandan television station

- Country: Uganda
- Broadcast area: National
- Network: M-Net
- Headquarters: MultiChoice Headquarters Kololo Kampala

Programming
- Language: English
- Picture format: 720 HDTV

Ownership
- Owner: MultiChoice (Canal+ S.A.)
- Sister channels: Pearl Magic Prime (2021 — present)

History
- Launched: 1 October 2018; 7 years ago

Links
- Website: pearlmagic.dstv.com

Availability

Terrestrial
- DStv: Channel 161
- GOtv: Channel 304

Pearl Magic is a Ugandan television station owned by MultiChoice Uganda' DStv. The station was launched in October 2018 with its headquarters and studios at the MultiChoice Uganda headquarters in Kololo Kampala and only broadcasts through DStv and GOtv to audiences around Africa.

At its launch, Pearl Magic was branded as the television channel that would promote Ugandan culture from film, television and music, airing 100 percent of local Ugandan content. The station has since broadcast a number of syndicated television series some of which had aired on other stations and others being first run syndicates. Such shows include; The Honourables, Mizigo Express, Sesiria, Loving Tyra, and others.

== Sister channels ==
=== Pearl Magic Prime ===
Pearl Magic Prime
- Country: Uganda
- Network: M-Net; Pearl Magic
- Headquarters: Kololo, Kampala

Programming
- Language: English
- Picture format: 720 HDTV

Ownership
- Owner: MultiChoice Uganda

History
- Launched: 8 February 2021; 5 years ago

Links
- Website: pearlmagicprime.dstv.com

Pearl Magic Prime is DStv's flagship channel for Uganda middle and upper bracket TV audiences. It is a 24-hour General Entertainment Channel targeted at Compact, Compact Plus and Premium Uganda pay TV audiences. The Channel showcases premium, authentic Ugandan local content.

With a context mix of telenovelas, reality, drama, comedy, Lifestyle, Music and Uganda movies, Pearl Magic Prime is the home to Ugandan Premium local content. Pearl Magic Prime is exclusively available on DSTV Channel 148.

== TV series ==
Title	First broadcast	Last broadcast
5 @Home		
The Hostel		
Campus Life		
Love Makanika		
Mistakes Girls Do	2018	
Ba Aunt		
Sesiria		
Loving Tyra	2020	
The Honourables		
Mizigo Express	October 2018	
False Dreams	January 2020	
The Lukkas	July 2020	
Kyaddala	3 July, 2022	
KanSeeMe	15 January, 2023	
