= IKON Awards =

Business and industry award

iKON Awards: Film and Television
- Current: 3rd iKON Awards
- Awarded for: Outstanding achievements film and television
- Country: Uganda
- Presented by: SAUTIplus Media Hub
- First award: 2023
- Website: www.theikon.org/awards

The iKon Awards - Film & Television is an awarding programme that recognizes and rewards implementers and personalities in the Film and Television and Mainstream Media in Uganda and ultimately, Africa. Founded by Humphrey Nabimanya, the new annual initiative is now presented by SAUTIplus Media Hub.

The awards seek to award (recognize and reward formidable implementers including filmmakers and actors), connect (link participants and their interventions/films/show/series to opportunities for resource mobilisation, networking, core organisational development, and publicity) and educate (through one-on-one sessions, webinars, online courses and summits from professionals in the film industry).

== Background ==
The 1st Ikon Awards ceremony, presented by the Sauti Plus Hub, honored Ugandan films released from 2021 and 2022, and took place at the Kampala Serena Hotel in Kampala, Uganda, on March 25, 2023.

Film producer Usama Mukwaya was named as producer of the inaugural edition which marked his first "live" television production credit for a major show. He returned for the second and 3rd editions.

The nominations were announced by actors Laura Kahunde and Sam Bagenda on January 28, 2023, live on NBS TV./

The following are the categories for the iKon awards unveiled during its launch at the Kampala Serena Hotel

=== Awards ===
Ikon Award categories
	Category
1	Best Film
2	Best Director
3	Best Actor
4	Best Actress
5	Best Supporting Actor
6	Best Supporting Actress
7	Best Director of Photography
8	Best Screenplay
9	Best Sound
10	Best Editor
11	Best Costume Designer
12	Best Makeup and Hairstyling
13	Best Production Designer
14	Best Visual Effects
15	Best Short film
16	Best Documentary
17	Best Animation film
18	Best TV Series
19	Best Actor in a TV Series
20	Best Actress in a TV Series
21	Best Student film
22	Best Emerging film
23	iKON Rising Star
24	iKON Fellow of The Year
25	Legacy Award

=== Young Filmmakers Fellowship Program ===
The opportunity is designed to target young, passionate, enthusiastic and emerging filmmakers interested in filmmaking and the film industry. Ten young filmmakers will be supported with a $500 grant each to produce a 5- to 10-minute short films and also provided with mentorship from experienced filmmakers.
