= Nana Kagga =

Ugandan screenwriter, filmmaker and actress (born 1977)

Nana Kagga Macpherson
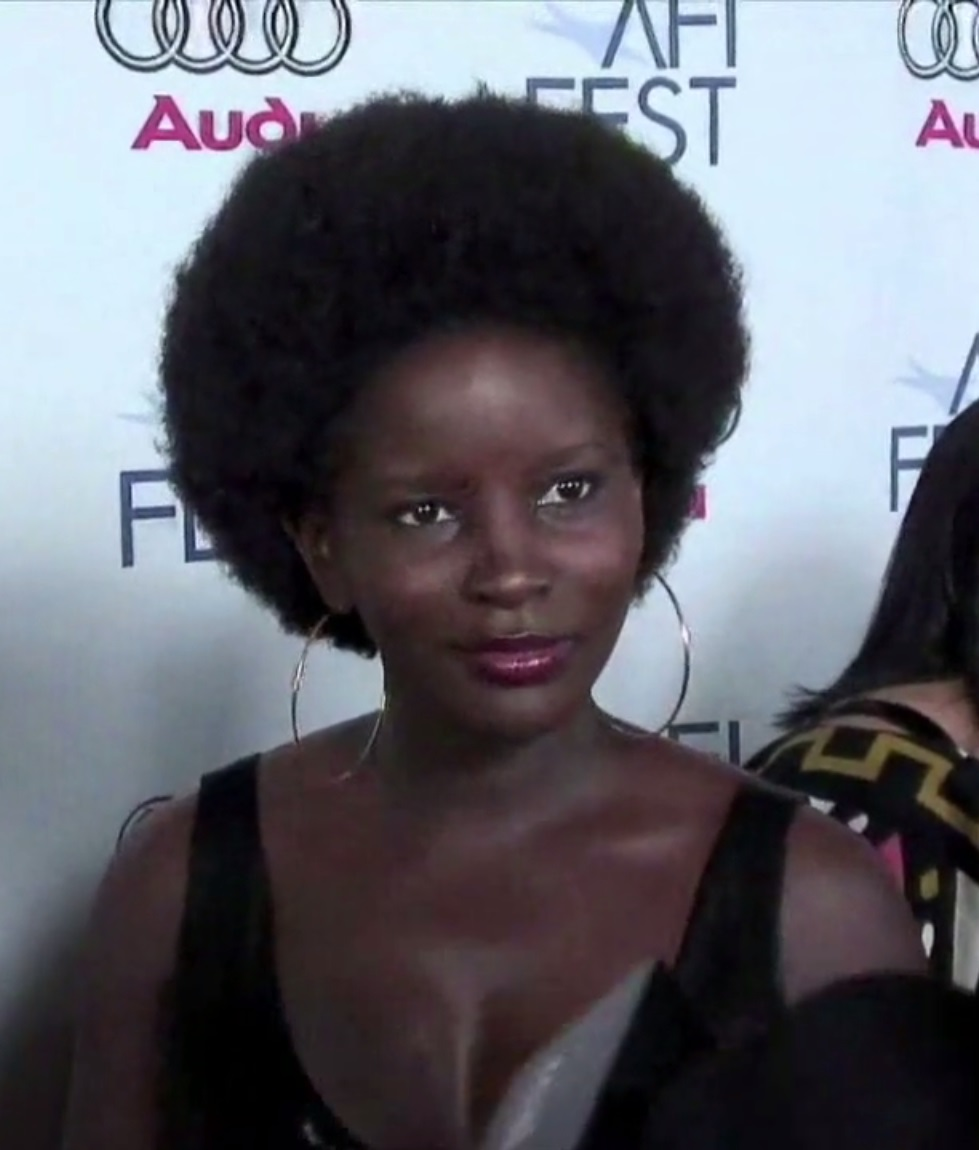
- Kagga interviewed by RealTVfilms in 2008
- Born: Nana Kagale Kagga; 6 April 1977 (age 49); Uganda
- Education: University of Birmingham, UK
- Occupations: Screenwriter; producer; actress; director
- Years active: 2003–present
- Children: 3
- Awards: Best Actress in a Feature Film, 2022

Nana Kagga (also known as Nana Kagga-Hill or Nana Hill or Nana Macpherson) is a Ugandan filmmaker, scriptwriter and actress. She wrote and directed the 2012 film The Life and was a writer and executive producer of Beneath the Lies – The Series. She has written Mukisa, My Sister's Keeper with Clive Nshiime, Pieces of Me and many more. She is the co-owner of Savannah MOON, a production company in Uganda.

== Life and background ==
Kagga was born in Nairobi, Kenya to Ugandan parents, one an engineer. Kagga is a Muganda and part of the traditional ruling clan of the Baganda tribe, the Bambejja (princesses). Kagga is the third of six children of both her parents. At the time of her birth, her parents were in exile during the regime of President Idi Amin. Kagga grew up primarily in Uganda in a well-to-do family. In addition to her father and maternal grandfather, four of her siblings are also engineers. Kagga resides in Kampala, Uganda with her 3 children. She is fluent in English and Luganda.

== Education ==
Kagga completed her Primary education at Kampala Parents School. She then joined Gayaza High School, one of the most prestigious girl's schools in Uganda, for her O-Levels. She then did her A-Levels at Red Maids School, Bristol, the oldest Girls' School in the UK. Kagga then joined the University of Birmingham, Birmingham, UK where she attained a bachelor's degree in chemical engineering. Kagga was an excellent all-round student who excelled in sciences, arts and sports. During her summer holidays, she would return to Uganda and was a presenter for Jam Agenda on WBS, a popular Ugandan TV show.

== Career ==
=== Engineering ===
Following her graduation, Kagga moved to Florida, United States, then New Mexico, United States. In New Mexico, she worked at Laguna Industries as a Process Engineer in Laguna working on US Military contracts.

=== Hollywood (as Nana Hill) ===
Kagga decided to move to pursue her acting and presenting in Los Angeles and enjoyed some success. Kagga was cast in a number of films including Cowboys and Indians, A Good Day to Be Black and Sexy (Segment 'Reprise'), He's Just Not That into You, Star Trek, CSI: NY – Boo, Life, Runway Stars. In US Theatre, Kagga was cast as Mercy in the play, Butterflies of Uganda by Darren Dahms which was nominated for an NAACP award. Kagga appeared in several music videos by P!nk, Amy Winehouse, Sting, Lenny Kravitz. Kagga also appeared in several TV ads including for KFC, Coors Light, Pepsi, DSW, Microsoft, APPLE, Tylenol, DOVE. While in L.A, Kagga also owned a vintage and resale store on Santa Monica Blvd called A Vintage Affair.

=== In Uganda ===
Kagga moved back to Uganda in late 2009 and set up a business, Savannah MOON Ltd. Savannah MOON under the brand, Savannah MOON Productions produced a full-length feature film, The Life which was shown on M-NET, a TV Series Beneath The Lies – The Series, which is currently being shown on Urban TV and digitally distributed by MTN Uganda. Savannah MOON has also co-produced several short and Feature films in addition to TV series.

Nana has created an initiative, You are Limitless (YAL), which aims to motivate, guide and encourage Africans, especially the youth to achieve their full potential. Kagga also works as a Petroleum Engineer for one of the large Oil & Gas companies operating in Uganda. She was one of the judges for Miss Uganda 2018.

== Filmography ==
=== As an actress ===
==== Film ====
Year	Film	Role	Director	Notes
2022	Nalwawo	Nanta	Emokor Eric	Produced at Savannah MOON Productions, Geoffix Films, Spectacle Media
2022	Pieces of Me	Indigo Gray Namukasa	Nsubuga Nicholas	Produced by Savannah MOON Productions
2009	Star Trek	Enterprise Crew Member	J. J. Abrams	Paramount Pictures
2009	He's Just Not That into You	Party Guest	Ken Kwapis	Universal Pictures
2008	A Good Day to Be Black and Sexy (Segment Reprise)	Candi	Dennis Dortch	Magnolia Pictures
2007	Collision			Independent film
2007	Hitch-hike			Independent film
2007	Cowboys and Indians	Indian		Short film

==== Television ====
Year	Title	Role	Director	Notes
2021	Damalie			TV series created and produced by Doreen Mirembe for Pearl Magic Prime
2021	Prestige	Jazmine		TV series produced by Ava Juliet Productions for Pearl Magic Prime
2014	Beneath the Lies – The Series	Attorney General	Joseph Katsha Kyasi	TV series, Savannah MOON Productions
2008	Runway Stars	Angel		Web series
2008	Life (NBC TV series)	Pretty Black Girl		TV series, NBC
2007	CSI: NY – Boo	Josephine Delacroix	Joe Dante	TV series, CBS
2006	BET Stars			BET

==== Theater ====
Year	Title	Role	Director	Theater	Notes
2008	Butterflies of Uganda	Mercy	Darren Dahms	Mercy	Greenway Theater September–October 2008

=== As a crew member ===
Year	Film/TV series	Role	Director	Notes
2023	Kasozi Heights (Feature film)	Co-Director, Casting Director, Assistant, Script Editor, Acting Coach	Emokor Eric	Produced by Ceekay Films
2023	Goolo (Feature film)	Exec. Producer, Script Writer/Editor, Casting Director, Art Director	Geoffrey Kasozi	Produced by Savannah MOON, Commissioned by Maisha Magic Movies
2022	Mukisa (Feature film)	Exec. Director, Script-writer, Casting Director, Production/ Set Designer	Geoffrey Kasozi	Produced by Savannah MOON, Commissioned by Maisha Magic Movies
2022	My Sister's Keeper (Feature film)	Director, Exec. Producer, Script-writer, Casting Director, Set Designer	Nana Kagga	Produced by Savannah MOON, Commissioned by Maisha Magic Movies
2022	Pieces of Me (Feature film)	Actor, Script-writer, Casting Director, Exec. Producer, Set Designer	Nsubuga Nicholas	Produced by Savannah MOON, Commissioned by Maisha Magic Movies
2022	Nalwawo (Feature film)	Actor, Creator, scriptwriter, producer	Emokor Eric	Produced by Savannah MOON, Geoffix99 Films, Spectacle Media
2021	Empaabi (Feature film)	Co-Director, Casting Director, Exec. Producer	Geoffrey Kasozi, Nana Kagga	Produced by Savannah MOON, Geoffix99 Films, Spectrum Uganda Media
2020	Embeera (Short film)	Director, Script-writer, Casting Director, Exec. Producer	Nana Kagga	Produced by Savannah MOON, Geoffix99 Films
2020	Ubuntu (Short film)	Director, Script-writer, Casting Director, Exec. Producer	Nana Kagga	Produced by Savannah MOON, Geoffix99 Films
2019	Mela (TV/ Web series)	Creator, Scriptwriter, Director	Maria Corrazon, Nana Kagga	Produced by Savannah MOON
2019	The Quarry (Short film)	Casting Director, Exec. Producer	Eddie Kagutuzi	Produced by Savannah MOON, Baby Plantains production, Balkon Films
2018	Reflections (TV Series pilot episodes)	Creator, scriptwriter, director		TV series starring Cleopatra Koheirwe, Gladys Oyenbot, Housen Mushema
2016	The Last Breath (Short film)	Executive producer, Casting Director	Jordan Braise Ndawula	Produced by Savannah MOON, Kampala Film School, Balkon films
2014	Beneath The Lies – The Series	Creator, scriptwriter, Executive Producer		Produced by Kinetic Management Group, 40-Plus Productions, Savannah MOON
2014	How We See It	Host, director, producer		Ugandan talk show
2012	The Life (Feature film)	Director, producer	Nana Kagga	Produced by Savannah MOON.

== Awards ==
Awards & Nominations
Year	Award	Category	Work	Result	Ref
2023	Uganda Film Festival Awards 2023	Best Actress in a Feature film	Pieces of Me	Nominated	
2023	Uganda Film Festival Awards 2023	Best Screen-play	Pieces of Me	Nominated	
2023	Uganda Film Festival Awards 2023	Best Feature Film (as Producer)	Mukisa	Won	
2023	Uganda Film Festival Awards 2023	Best Production Design	Mukisa	Won	
2023	Uganda Film Festival Awards 2023	Best Film in indigenous language (as Producer)	Mukisa	Nominated	
2023	Uganda Film Festival Awards 2023	Viewer's Choice (as Producer)	Mukisa	Nominated	
2023	Uganda Film Festival Awards 2023	Best Costume Design	Mukisa	Nominated	
2023	Uganda Film Festival Awards 2023	Best Screen-play	Mukisa	Nominated	
2022	Uganda Film Festival Awards 2022	Best Actress in a Feature Film	Nalwawo	Won	
2022	Uganda Film Festival Awards 2022	Best Indigenous Film	Nalwawo	Won	
2021	Uganda Film Festival Awards 2021	Best Actress in a TV Drama	Prestige	Won	
