= 1st iKON Awards =

Ugandan film awards

- Date: March 25, 2023
- Site: Kampala Serena Hotel; Kampala, Uganda
- Hosted by: Anita Fabiola, Moses Kiboneka
- Produced by: Usama Mukwaya
- Directed by: Bushingtone

The 1st Ikon Awards ceremony, presented by the Sauti Plus Hub, honored Ugandan films released from 2021 and 2022, and took place at the Kampala Serena Hotel in Kampala, Uganda, on March 25, 2023.

== Schedule ==
Date	Event
Saturday, January 28, 2023	Nominations announcement
Saturday, February 11, 2023	Nominees luncheon
Saturday, March 25, 2023	IKON Awards

== Nominees and winners ==
The nominations were announced by actors Laura Kahunde and Sam Bagenda on January 28, 2023. The main awards who will be hosted by Anita Fabiola and comedian Moses Kiboneka

== Awards ==
Best Film	Best Director
Kafa Coh, Doreen Mirembe; Bedroom Chains, Hassan Mageye; My Husbands Wife, Mariam Ndagire; Tembele, Morris Mugisha	Gilbert Lukalia, Doreen Mirembe, Kafa Coh; Hassan Mageye, Bedroom Chains; Loukman Ali, The Girl in the Yellow Jumper; Morris Mugisha, Tembele
Best Actor	Best Actress
Michael Wawuyo Jr., The Girl in the Yellow Jumper; John Mary Ssekimpi My Husbands Wife; Michael Wawuyo, Kafa Coh; Patriq Nkakalukanyi, Tembele	Nisha Kalema, Bedroom Chains; Tracy Kababiito, Mukisa; Winfred Nafula, My Husbands Wife; Rhona Ninsiima, Tembele
Best Actor in a Supporting Role	Best Actress in a Supporting Role
Cosmos Sserubogo, Tembele; Daniel Papa Mushikoma, Foot Wine; Kalu Egbui Ikeagwu, Kafa Coh; Michael Wawuyo, The Girl in the Yellow Jumper	Rehema Nanfuka, Kafa Coh; Mariam Ndagire, Kafa Coh; Sarafina Muhawenimana, Pieces Of Me; Tania Shakirah Kankindi, My Husbands Wife
Best Screenplay	Ikon Rising Star
Mariam Ndagire, My Husbands Wife; Hassan Mageye, Bedroom Chains; Morris Mugisha, Tembele; Kevin Johns Nabukenya, The Wave	Cosmas Sserubogo; Tuyi Mariserena; Kaddu Sadat
Best Cinematography	Best Production Design
Naizi Nasser, The Girl in the Yellow Jumper; Benson Kamau Mungai, Bedroom Chains; Izaek Ekuka, Tembele; Mustaque Abdallah, Kafa Coh	Rhonnie Nkalubo, Robina Nansubuga, Kafa Coh; Morris Mugisha, Tembele; Hassan Mageye, Mumpi Joseph Sserubiri, Bedroom Chains; Nana Kagga, Pieces Of Me
Best Costume Design	Best Makeup and Special Effects
Irene Sseremba, Bedroom Chains; Nadia Gisella, The Girl in the Yellow Jumper; Rachael Nakito, Josephine Lule, The Test; Whitney G. Najuuko, Kafa Coh	Shakirah Kibirige, Kafa Coh; Shakirah Kibirige, The Test; Shakirah Kibirige, Tembele; Nakakande Cynthia, Bedroom Chains
Best Editing	Best Sound
Loukman Ali, The Girl in the Yellow Jumper; Andrew Odera, Kafa Coh; Kyobe Ssebowa, Bedroom Chains; Paul Kimera, Bashan Mukwaya, Tembele	Quad A, The Girl in the Yellow Jumper; Kyobe Isma Ssebowa, Bedroom Chains; Adnan Ssenkumba, Kafa Coh; Ssemujju Isima, Tembele
Best Visual Effects	Best Animation Film
The Girl in the Yellow Jumper, Loukman Ali; Kafa Coh, Ochwo Emmanuel; Tembele, Shakirah Kibirige; My Husbands Wife, Suuna Peter	No Way Out, Mulima Ashraf; A Thousand Fate, Mulima Ashraf; Ttula, Mwesigwa Benjamin; Breakout, Nkugwa Shaffic
Best Actress in a TV Series	Best Actor in a TV Series
Sally Elizabeth Bwamimpeke, Prestige; Eleanor Nabwiso, Sanyu; Joan Agaba, What If; Stella Nante, The Honourables	Allan Kutos Katongole, Sanyu; Joel Okuyo Atiku, What If; Q-Kamber Fredel, Gamyuuse; Simon Base Kalema, Prestige
Best TV Series	Best Documentary
Prestige, Nathan Magoola; Sanyu, Mathew Nabwiso; What If, Richard Mulindwa; The Honourables, John Ssegawa	Pius, Brian Mukisa; Little Faith; Ebyo Byaa Balogo
Best Short Film	Best Student Film
Sixteen Rounds, Loukman Ali; Enyama, Asher Rosen; Engaito, Isiko Abubaker; The Heartbeat, Mathew Nabwiso	Pius, Brian Mukisa; My Degree, Brian Kabogozza; Milk Of Human Kindness, Ssenyondwa Umaru
Ikon Fellow of the Year	Best Emerging Film
Mirembe Doreen - Mama Wange	Footwine, Maynard mulindwa

=== Life Time Achievement Award ===
- John W. Katende

== Presenters and performers ==
The following presented awards and performed musical numbers.

Presenter(s)
Name(s)	Role
Sheila Salter	Announcer for the 1st Ikon Awards
Doreen Nabanja	Presenter of the award for Best Visual Effects
Allan Manzi	Presenter of the award for Best Short film
Cleopatra Koheirwe	Presenter of the award for Best Documentary film
Osman Matovu; Lydia Namata	Presenters of the award for Best Animation
Lutakome Tony Kayanja	Presenter of the award for Best Student Film
Ali Mutaka	Presenter of the award for Best Sound
Irene Sewankambo; Lubowa Yasin	Presenters of the award for Best Editor
Sarah Kisawuzi	Presenter of the award for Best Make up and Hairstyling
Natasha Sinayobye	Presenter of the award for Best Costume Design
Sam Bagenda	Presenter of the award for Best Production Design
Harriet Nalubwama	Presenter of the Life time Achievement Award
Catherine Namugenyi	Presenter of the Rising Star Award
Prossy Mukisa	Presenter of the Emerging Film Award
Fauziah Nakiboneka	Presenter of the award for Best Actor in a tv series
Aisha Kyomuhangi	Presenter of the award for Best Actress in a tv series
Faridah Ndausi	Presenter of the award for Best Supporting Actor
Hamida Mukandutiye	Presenter of the award for Best Supporting Actress
Godfrey Musinguzi	Presenter of the award for Best TV Drama
Oyenbot	Presenter of the award for Best Cinematography
Nana Kagga	Presenter of the award for Best Screenplay
Raymond Rushabiro	Presenter of the award for Best Actress in a leading Role
Ramsey Nouah	Presenter of the award for Best Actor in a leading Role
Matt Bish	Presenter of the award for Best Director
Abby Mukiibi Nkaaga	Presenter of the award for Best film
Usama Mukwaya	Presenter of the "In Memoriam" segment
