= Uganda Film Festival Award for Best Supporting Actor =

Category of film award

- Awarded for: Excellence in Cinematic Support Acting Achievement
- Country: Uganda
- Presented by: Uganda Communications Commission (UCC)

The Uganda Film Festival Award for Best Supporting Actor is an award presented annually by the Uganda Communications Commission (UCC) to a male supporting actor for outstanding acting in a supporting role at the Uganda Film Festival Awards. The category was introduced in 2015 but was suspended in 2016 and 2017 and re-introduced in 2018.

== Winners and nominees ==
The table shows the winners and nominees for the Best Supporting Actor award.

Table key
indicates the winner

Year	Actor	Film	Ref.
2015 (3rd)	Michael Wawuyo	Abaabi Ba Boda (Boda Boda Thieves)	
2015 (3rd)	Jakirah Suudi	House Arrest	
2015 (3rd)	Ronnie Lugumba	Hanged For Love	
2015 (3rd)	Bobi Wine	Situka	
2018 (6th)	Symon Base Kalema	Veronica's Wish	
2018 (6th)	Housen Mushema	Veronica's Wish	
2018 (6th)	Tembo the Mad Boyfriend	Deranged	
2018 (6th)	Michael Wawuyo Jr.	Kyenvu	
2018 (6th)	Kaye Trevor	The Forbidden	
2019 (7th)	Michael Wawuyo Jr.	Bed of Thorns	
2019 (7th)	Raymond Rushabiro	N.S.I.W.E	
2019 (7th)	Kayongo Abasi	Grade 7 Girl	
2019 (7th)	Zziwa Dungu Jaubarl	August	

== Multiple wins and nominations ==
No actor has won this category multiple times. The following actors have received two or more Best Supporting Actor nominations

Nominations	Actor
2	Michael Wawuyo Jr.
