= Stain (film) =

Ugandan drama film

- Directed by: Morris Mugisha
- Written by: Morris Mugisha, Ninsiima Ronah
- Produced by: Morris Mugisha
- Starring: Joan Agaba; Debbie Bakuseka; Tembo Gift; Symon Base Kalema; Raymond Rushabiro; Allen Musumba
- Cinematography: Ekuka Izaek; Kimera Paul
- Edited by: Kimera Paul
- Music by: Morris Mugisha; Charmant Mushaga
- Production company: Moideas
- Release date: 1 March 2021
- Running time: 1:15
- Country: Uganda
- Languages: Luganda, English

Stain is a Ugandan drama film produced and directed by Morris Mugisha. It premiered in Kampala on March 1, 2021, and was Mugisha's directorial debut. The film received 7 nominations at the Africa Movie Academy Awards in Nigeria and Joan Agaba won the award for Best Actress in a Leading role. The film also won 5 awards out of 12 nominations at the 2021 Uganda Film Festival Awards.

== Plot ==
A 29-year-old mother of one, Mina, takes over as breadwinner in the home when her husband Bomboka is maimed after a domestic wrangle.

== Nominations and awards ==
Awards & Nominations
Year	Award	Category	Received by	Result	Ref
2021	Africa Movie Academy Awards	Best Actress in a Leading Role	Joan Agaba	Won	
2021	Africa Movie Academy Awards	Best Director	Morris Mugisha	Nominated	
2021	Africa Movie Academy Awards	Best Film		Nominated	
2021	Africa Movie Academy Awards	Ousmane Sembene AMAA 2021 Award for Best Film in an African Language	Morris Mugisha	Nominated	
2021	Africa Movie Academy Awards	AMAA 2021 Award for Achievement in Visual Effect		Nominated	
2021	Africa Movie Academy Awards	AMAA 2021 Award for Achievement in Cinematography		Nominated	
2021	Africa Movie Academy Awards	AMAA 2021 Award for Achievement in Screenplay		Nominated	
2021	Uganda Film Festival Awards	Viewers' Choice Award		Nominated	
2021	Uganda Film Festival Awards	Best Indigenous Film Award		Nominated	
2021	Uganda Film Festival Awards	Best Feature Film		Won	
2021	Uganda Film Festival Awards	Best Cinematography	Ekuka Isaac	Won	
2021	Uganda Film Festival Awards	Best Costume Design	Ninsiima Ronah	Won	
2021	Uganda Film Festival Awards	Best Production Design	Imran Musabbeh	Nominated	
2021	Uganda Film Festival Awards	Best Sound Design	Mbabazi Daniel	Nominated	
2021	Uganda Film Festival Awards	Best Script (Screenplay)	Mugisha Morris & Ninsiima Ronah	Nominated	
2021	Uganda Film Festival Awards	Best Post-Production/Editing	Kimera Paul	Nominated	
2021	Uganda Film Festival Awards	Best Director	Mugisha Morris	Nominated	
2021	Uganda Film Festival Awards	Best Actor in Feature Film	Raymond Rushabiro	Won	
2021	Uganda Film Festival Awards	Best Actress in Feature Film	Joan Agaba	Won	
