= 2018 Africa Magic Viewers' Choice Awards =

6th Africa Magic Viewers' Choice Awards
- Date: 1 September 2018
- Site: Eko Hotel and Suites, Lagos, Nigeria
- Hosted by: IK Osakioduwa, Minnie Dlamini

Highlights
- Best Film: 18 Hours
- Most awards: Tatu (4)
- Most nominations: Tatu (11)

The 2018 Africa Magic Viewers' Choice Awards was held 1 September 2018 at Eko Hotel and Suites, Lagos.

Nominees were revealed on June 30, 2018.

== Awards ==
Winners are listed highlighted in boldface.

Best Sound Editor	Best Picture Editor
**Kolade Morakinyo and Pius Fatoke - Tatu**; Stanlee Ohikhuare - Idahosa Trails; Zezom Gnawni - Alter Ego; Dayo Thompson - Ojukokoro; James Coon Falcon - Hakkunde	**18 Hours - Mark Maina**; Idemuza – Aloaye Omoake; Alter Ego – Moses Inwang/Tunde Bakare; Hakkunde – Asurf Oluseyi; Hidden – Jibril Mailafia
Best Soundtrack	Best Lighting Designer
**Tatu - Evelle**; M0 – Tom Koroluk; Banana Island Ghost – Enyi Omeruah and Funbi Ogunbanwo; Bella – Andrew Ahuura; Idahosa Trails – Oriri Osayamore; 18 Hours – Jacktone Okore	**Tatu – Akpe Ododoru, Tunde Akinniyi**; Kada River – Godwin Gata; Hidden – Agbo Kelly; Lotanna – Toka McBaror; Children of Mud – Sunday Olalekan
Best Cinematography	Best Costume Designer
**Okafor's Law - Yinka Edward**; Idemuza – Dickson Godwin; T-Junction – Lester Millado; The Torture – Rwamusigazi Kyakunzire; Tatu – Akpe Ododoru; Alter Ego – Bishop Blunt/Adeoye Adeniyi	**The Bridge – Ngozi Obasi and James Bessinone**; Tatu – Yolanda Okereke; Isoken – Jade Osiberu; Potato Potato – Christie Brown; Hakkunde – Joan Gbefwi
Best Short Film/Online Video	Best Documentary
**Penance - Micheal Ama Psalmist’ Akinrogunde**; Tolu – Nadine Ibrahim; The Housewife – Jay Franklin Jituboh; Lodgers – Ken Ogunlola; Tanwa: The Child we Wanted – Adenike Adebayo; Alter Ego – Bishop Blunt/Adeoye Adeniyi	**The Flesh Business – Dennis Wanjohi**; Nightfall in Lagos – James Amuta; God's Wives – Bolanle Olukanni; Omidan, Styles Defunct by Ayaworanho3d – Aderemi Davies; Oghenefego Ofili – Calabar Carnival: What the People Think
Best Makeup Artist	Best Art Director
**Tatu - Thelma Ozy Smith, Hakeem Effect Onilogbo**; Ojukokoro – Sandra Oyiana; What Lies Within – Cynthia Ububa; Disguise – Hakeem Effect; Lotanna – Nnnenna Emekalam	**Lotanna – Tunji Afolayan**; Isoken – Jade Osiberu; Tatu – Don Omope, Yolanda Okereke, Segun Arinze, Tolu Awobiyi; Children of Mud – Imoh Umoren; Idahosa Trails – Stanlee Ohikhuare; Hidden – Mailafia
Best Soundtrack	Best Indigenous Language (Swahili)
**Tatu - Evelle**; Mo – Tom Koroluk; Banana Island Ghost – Enyi Omeruah and Funbi Ogunbanwo; Bella – Andrew Ahuura; Idahosa Trails – Oriri Osayamore; 18 Hours – Jacktone Okore	**Super Modo – Sarika Hemi Lhakani**
Best Indigenous Language (Hausa)	Best Indigenous Language (Yoruba)
**Mansoor - Ali Nuhu**; Umar Sanda – Kamal Alkali; Dadin Kowa Sabon Salo – Arewa24; Uwar Bari – Hamisu Lamido Iyantama; Rashinsani – Tianah Johnson	**Etiko Onigedu - Femi Adebayo**; Alakiti – Abiodun Jimoh and Jumoke Odetola; Adaba – Adebayo Salami; Egun Iran Kinni – Oyindamola Awotidebe; Ogun Sengese – Ibironke Ojo
Best Indigenous Language (Igbo)	Best TV/Drama/Comedy
**Bound - Lilian Afegbai**; Ofuobi – Victor Oyke; Uwa Na Eme Nyughari – Tianah Johnson; Oge Nkem – Tianah Oboyi Johnson; Ego Malaysia – Iyooh James Chidozie	**This Is It (TV series) - Dolapo Adeleke**; Gina and Friends – Paul Igwe; Professor Johnbull – Tchidi Chikere; Papa Ajasco Reloaded – Wale Adenuga; Relatives – Tunde Adegbola
Best Movie East Africa	Best Movie West Africa
**18 Hours - Phoebe Ruguru**; Devil's Chest – Hassan Mageye; The Forbidden (2018 film) – Kizito Samuel Savior; The Rain – Mathew & Eleanor Nabwiso; Bella – Matt Bish	**Isoken - Jade Osiberu**; Potato Potahto – Shirley Frimpong-Manso; Alter Ego – Moses Inwang & Esther Eyibo; Tatu – Don Omope, Yolanda Okereke, Segun Arinze, Tolu Awobiyi; Children of Mud – Imoh Umoren; Lotanna – Ifan Michael
Best Movie Southern Africa	Best Writer in Movie/TV series
**The Road to Sunrise - Shemu Joyah**; Descent – Awal Abdulfatai; Salute – Philippe Talavera; Jomako Black Democracy – Abraham Kabwe; Nyasaland – Joyce Mhango Chavula	**Alter Ego (film) - Patrick Nnamani, Moses Inwang & Koye O**; Idemuza – Alaoye Omoake; Soul Tie – Kehinde Joseph; Idahosa Trails – Stanlee Ohikhuare; 18 Hours – Njue Kevin; The Torture – Mulindwa Richard; Hakkunde – Tomi Adeshina; The Torture – Mulindwa Richard
Best Supporting Actress	Best Supporting Actor
**Lydia Forson - Isoken**; Dorcas Shola Fapson – Banana Island Ghost; Funlola Aofiyebi-Raimi – Tatu; Ebele Okaro – Black Rose; Toyin Abraham - Tatu (film); Emem Inwang - Alter Ego	**Falz - New Money (film)**; Saheed Balogun – Banana Island Ghost; Tomiwa Edun – Banana Island Ghost; Kunle Idowu – Idahosa Trails; Gabriel Afolayan - Okafor's Law; Wale Ojo - Betrayal
Best Actress in a Comedy	Best Actor in a Comedy
**Nyce Wanjeri - Auntie Boss!**; Rita Dominic - Big Fat Lie; Adesua Etomi – 10 Days in Sun City; Queen Nwokoye – Excess Luggage; Bimbo Ademoye - Backup Wife; Dakore Akande - Isoken	**Odunlade Adekola - A Million Baby**; Kalu Ikeagwu – Dr. Meekam; IK Ogbonna – Excess Luggage; Blossom Chukwujekwu – The Big Fat Lie; OC Ukeje - Potato Potahto; Jimmy Olukoya - Guy Man
Best Actress in a Drama	Best Actor in a Drama
**Omotola Jalade Ekeinde - Alter Ego (film)**; Agaba Joan - The Torture; Keira Hewatch – The Witness Box; Miriam Kayode – Children of Mud; Cinderella Sanyu - Children of Mud; Lilian Echelon - Black Rose	**Adjetey Anang - Keteke**; Wale Ojo – Alter Ego; Kalu Ikeagwu – Benevolence; Rushabiro Raymond – The Torture; Adjetey Anang - Sidechic Gang; Chris Attoh - Esohe
Best Director	Best Overall Movie
**Jade Osiberu - Isoken**; Moses Inwang - Alter Ego; Aloaye Omoake – Idemuza; Asurf Oluseyi – Hakkunde; Don Omope - Tatu; Mulindwa Richard - The Torture; Shirley Frimpong-Manso - Potato Potahto	**18 Hours - Phoebe Ruguru**; Potato Potahto – Shirley Frimpong-Manso; Alter Ego (film) – Moses Inwang; Devil's Chest – Hassan Mageye; Descent - Awal Abdulfatai; Road to Sunrise - Shemu Joyah
Trailblazer Award	Industry Merit Award
Bisola Aiyeola	Tunde Kelani
