= Uganda Film Festival Award for Best Feature Film =

Category of film award

- Awarded for: Excellence in Cinematic Production Achievement
- Country: Uganda
- Presented by: Uganda Communications Commission (UCC)

The Uganda Film Festival Award for Best Feature Film is an award presented annually by Uganda Communications Commission (UCC) at the Uganda Film Festival Awards. Introduced in 2013 at the inception of the Uganda Film Festival Awards, the award is given in honor of a producer who has exhibited outstanding production for a feature film.

== Winners and nominees ==
The table shows the winners and nominees for the Best Feature Film award.

Table key
indicates the winner

Year	Film	Producer(s)	Ref.
2013 (1st)	State Research Bureau (S.R.B)	Matt Bish	
2013 (1st)	Akataka (The Small Piece)	Joseph Kenneth Ssebaggala	
2013 (1st)	The Route	Jayant Maru; Eric Wamasebu Bwanika Baale Felix	
2013 (1st)	King’s Virgin	Hassan Mageye	
2013 (1st)	Okusaalimba (The Trespass)	Dennis Dhikusooka	
2014 (2nd)	The Felistas Fable	Dilman Dila	
2014 (2nd)	Zamora	Javed Jafferji	
2014 (2nd)	Reform	Joseph Kenneth Ssebaggala	
2014 (2nd)	The Superstition	Deepak Gondaliya	
2014 (2nd)	Spying on Susana	Robert Nkambo	
2015 (3rd)	House Arrest		
2015 (3rd)	The Boda Boda Thieves (Abaabi Ba Boda)		
2015 (3rd)	The Tailor		
2015 (3rd)	Akattiro (The Death Corner)		
2015 (3rd)	Call 112		
2016 (4th)	Freedom	Richard Mulindwa	
2016 (4th)	Invisible Cuffs	Hassan Mageye	
2016 (4th)	Wako	Zziwa Aaron Alone	
2016 (4th)	New Intentions	Kennedy Kihire	
2016 (4th)	The Only Son	Richard Mulindwa	
2017 (5th)	Devil's Chest	Hassan Mageye	
2017 (5th)	Kony: Order from Above	Steven Ayeny	
2017 (5th)	Rain	Daniel Mugerwa	
2017 (5th)	Breaking with Customs	T. West Ttabu Wasswa	
2017 (5th)	The Torture	Richard Mulindwa	
2017 (5th)	Break In	Zziwa Aaron Alone	
2018 (6th)	Veronica's Wish	Nisha Kalema	
2018 (6th)	Bella	Matt Bish	
2018 (6th)	94 Terror	Richard Mulindwa	
2018 (6th)	The Agreement		
2018 (6th)	Slay Queens		
2019 (7th)	Lailah	Richard Mulindwa	
2019 (7th)	Red Rats		
2019 (7th)	N.S.I.W.E		
2019 (7th)	August		
2019 (7th)	Bed of Thorns	Eleanor Nabwiso	
2020	Skipped due to the Covid Pandemic		
2021 (8th)	Stain	Morris Mugisha	
2021 (8th)	Kemi		
2021 (8th)	Catch Out		
2021 (8th)	Monica		
2021 (8th)	Tecora		
2023 (10th)	The Passenger	Usama Mukwaya, Meddy Sserwadda, Hadijah Nakanjako	
2023 (10th)	Kafa Coh	Doreen Mirembe, Khai Sam	
2023 (10th)	The Kitara Chronicles	Yiga Sadat, Kizito SudaisySebbowa	
2023 (10th)	Mukisa	Meme Kagga, Nana Kagga	
2023 (10th)	When You Become Me	Mathew Nabwiso	

== Multiple wins and nominations ==
The following individuals have won multiple Best Feature film awards:

Wins	Producer
2	Richard Mulindwa

The following producers have received two or more Best Feature Film nominations

Nominations	Producer
5	Richard Mulindwa
3	Hassan Mageye
2	Zziwa Aaron Alone
2	Matt Bish
2	Joseph Kenneth Ssebaggala

== Records ==
- In 2016, Nisha Kalema was the first female producer whose film (Veronica's Wish) was nominated for the award, and became the first female producer to win the award with the same film that same year.
