= Malaika Tenish Nnyanzi =

Ugandan actress (born 1989)

Malaika
- Born: 15 December 1989 (age 36); Nairobi, Kenya
- Occupations: Actress, media personality
- Presenting career
- Show: Malaika and Oulanya
- Station: 91.3 Capital FM
- Time slot: 3pm - 6pm Mon-Fri
- Style: News, weather, entertainment, gossip
- Country: Uganda
- Previous shows: D'Mighty Breakfast on KFM (2017-2019); Urban Today and Fashionista on Urban TV (2014-2016)
- Other name: Malaika Tenshi Nnyanzi
- Education: Gayaza High School, Makerere College School, United States International University Africa
- Years active: 2014–present
- Employer(s): Capital Radio (Since 2019); KFM (2017-2019); Urban TV (2014-2016)

Malaika Tenshi Nnyanzi, professionally known by her mononym as Malaika, is a Ugandan actress, media personality, model and fashionista. She is mostly known for her radio work on the D’Mighty Breakfast show on KFM and Malaika and Oulanya on Capital Fm as well as her acting work on Veronica's Wish, Bed of Thorns, The Honourables and Mela.

== Career ==
=== Modeling and fashion ===
Malaika started her modeling career in Nairobi, Kenya. She also ran a model management company with a male partner and showcased their work at a number of events including the Swahili Fashion Week. She left Nairobi and moved to Uganda where she continued her modeling career alongside emceeing corporate and entertainment events. She is a brand ambassador for Sweet Lips wine.

=== Radio and television ===
On her return to Uganda from Kenya, Malaika joined Vision Group's Urban Television as a cohost with Gaetano Kagwa on a morning breakfast show called Urban Today. She later left Urban Today and hosted Fashionista before she left Urban Television altogether in November 2016. She also joined South African entertainment channel Rockstar Group as the new face of a television show called SHOOOOSH! Malaika started her radio career at KFM in Kampala in April 2017. She co-hosted a morning breakfast show, D’Mighty Breakfast show with Brian Mulondo. In 2019, she left KFM and joined Capital Fm and started hosting Malaika and Oulanya with Oulanya Columbus replacing Gaetano and Lucky in their Overdrive slot.

=== Acting ===
Malaika debuted her acting career on Nisha Kalema's 2018 drama film Veronica's Wish playing a supporting role as Bankia. She received two nominations for the role in the Best Supporting Actress category at the 2018 Uganda Film Festival Awards and ZAFAA Global Awards in 2019. She was then cast in the lead role as Stella in a 2019 Eleanor Nabwiso directed film Bed of Thorns. For this role, Malaika was nominated and won the Best Actress Award at the 2019 Uganda Film Festival Awards. She was also cast in a lead role as Mela Katende in Nana Kagga's family drama series Mela and joined The Honourables in 2019 as a main cast member.

== Personal life ==
Malaika was born Malaika Nnyanzi to Ugandan parents in Nairobi Kenya, where her father, a former Ugandan army man had been exiled. Her family moved back to Uganda and settled in Kampala. She went to school at Safari Kindergarten, Kampala Parents School, Gayaza High School and Makerere College before returning to Kenya where she graduated with a bachelor's degree in International Business at the United States International University Africa in Nairobi. In 2018, during an interview with Crystal Newman on her show Crystal 1 On 1, Malaika came out as epileptic and as a victim of rape by her work partner due to epilepsy, something she had kept private for over ten years and caused her depression.
