= Uganda Film Festival Award for Best Supporting Actress =

Category of film award

- Awarded for: Excellence in Cinematic Support Acting Achievement
- Country: Uganda
- Presented by: Uganda Communications Commission (UCC)

The Uganda Film Festival Award for Best Supporting Actress is an award presented annually by Uganda Communications Commission (UCC) to a female supporting actor (actress) who has exhibited outstanding acting in a film support role at the Uganda Film Festival Awards. This category was introduced in 2015 but was discontinued in 2016 and 2017 and re-introduced in 2018.

== Winners and nominees ==
The table shows the winners and nominees for the Best Supporting Actress award.

Table key
indicates the winner

Year	Actress	Film	Ref.
2015 (3rd)	Nanziri Fausta	The Tailor	
2015 (3rd)	Orishaba Damali	Galz About Town	
2015 (3rd)	Aaliyah Nanfuka	My Rising Sun	
2015 (3rd)	Rahma Kadara	Akattiro (The Death Corner)	
2015 (3rd)	Hellen Lukoma	Situka	
2018 (6th)	Stellah Nantumbwe	Bella	
2018 (6th)	Joan Agaba	94 Terror	
2018 (6th)	Nalukenge Sophia	Kikumi Kikumi	
2018 (6th)	Malaika	Veronica's Wish	
2018 (6th)	Hellen Nakamya	The Agreement	
2019 (7th)	Aganza Kisaka	N.S.I.W.E	
2019 (7th)	Diana Kahunde	Bed of Thorns	
2019 (7th)	Ninsiima Ronah	Lailah	
2019 (7th)	Agaba Joan	Lailah	

== Multiple wins and nominations ==
No actress has won this category multiple times. The following actresses have received two or more Best Supporting Actress nominations

Nominations	Actress
2	Joan Agaba
