= Uganda Film Festival Award for Best Director =

Category of film award

- Awarded for: Excellence in Cinematic Direction Achievement
- Country: Uganda
- Presented by: Uganda Communications Commission (UCC)
- First award: 2013

The Uganda Film Festival Award for Best Director, also known as Feature Film of the Year, is an award presented annually by the Uganda Communications Commission (UCC) at the Uganda Film Festival Awards. It is given in honor of a film director who has exhibited outstanding directing while working in the film industry in Uganda. It's different from Best Feature Film which is awarded for best motion. The award was introduced in 2013 and the first winner of the award was Matt Bish for his directing work on State Research Bureau. Rehema Nanfuka became the first female director to be nominated at the Uganda Film Festival Awards in 2018 and became the first female director to win the award in Uganda.

== Winners and nominees ==
The table below shows winners and nominees for Best Director since the inception of the award in 2013.

Table key
indicates the winner

| Year | Director(s) | Film | Ref. |
|---|---|---|---|
| 2013 (1st) | Matt Bish | State Research Bureau | |
| 2013 (1st) | Joseph Kenneth Ssebaggala | Akataka (The Small Piece) | |
| 2013 (1st) | Alex Musisi | Uganda at 50 Years | |
| 2013 (1st) | Alex Musisi | Intimate | |
| 2014 (2nd) | Dilman Dila | The Felistas Fable | |
| 2015 (3rd) | Joseph S Ken | House Arrest | |
| 2015 (3rd) | Hassan Mageye | The Tailor | |
| 2015 (3rd) | Farooq Mutebi | Call 112 | |
| 2015 (3rd) | Hassan 'Spike' Isingoma | The Boda Boda Thieves | |
| 2015 (3rd) | Alex Kakooza | My Rising Sun | |
| 2015 (3rd) | Ronnie Lugumba | Hanged For Love | |
| 2016 (4th) | Richard Mulindwa | Freedom | |
| 2016 (4th) | Richard Mulindwa | The Only Son | |
| 2016 (4th) | Kennedy Kihire | New Intentions | |
| 2016 (4th) | Hassan Mageye | Invisible Cuffs | |
| 2016 (4th) | Ziwa Aaron Alone | Wako | |
| 2017 (5th) | Hassan Mageye | Devil's Chest | |
| 2017 (5th) | Steven Ayeny | Kony: Order from Above | |
| 2017 (5th) | T. West Ttabu Wasswa | Breaking with Customs | |
| 2017 (5th) | Daniel Mugerwa | Rain | |
| 2018 (6th) | Rehema Nanfuka | Veronica's Wish | |
| 2018 (6th) | Matt Bish | Bella | |
| 2018 (6th) | Richard Mulindwa | 94 Terror | |
| 2018 (6th) | Benluxus | Slay Queens | |
| 2018 (6th) | Isaac Ssekitoleko | Kikumi Kikumi | |
| 2019 (7th) | Richard Mulindwa | Lailah | |
| 2019 (7th) | Robert Katoggo | Red Rats | |
| 2019 (7th) | Roger MatelJa Mugabirwe | N.S.I.W.E | |
| 2019 (7th) | Eleanor Nabwiso | Bed of Thorns | |

== Multiple wins and nominations ==
The following individuals have won multiple Best Director awards:

| Wins | Director |
|---|---|
| 2 | Richard Mulindwa |

The following directors have received two or more Best Director nominations

| Nominations | Director |
|---|---|
| 4 | Richard Mulindwa |
| 2 | Hassan Mageye |
| 2 | Alex Musisi |

== Superlatives ==
| Record | Year | Director | Film | Ref. |
|---|---|---|---|---|
| First winner | 2013 | Matt Bish | State Research Bureau | |
| First Female Winner | 2018 | Rehema Nanfuka | Veronica's Wish | |

=== Female nominees/winners ===
Two female directors have been nominated in the category, and one has won the award.

- 2018 Rehema Nanfuka for Veronica's Wish
- 2019 Eleanor Nabwiso for Bed of Thorns
