= Uganda Film Festival Award for Best Actor in Film =

Category of film award

Uganda Film Festival Award for Best Actor in a Feature Film
- Awarded for: Excellence in Cinematic Acting Achievement
- Country: Uganda
- Presented by: Uganda Communications Commission (UCC)
- Website: official

The Uganda Film Festival Award for Best Actor is an award presented annually by Uganda Communications Commission (UCC) at the Uganda Film Festival. It is given in honor of a male actor who has exhibited outstanding acting while working in the film industry in Uganda. The award was introduced in 2014 with Isaac Kuddu as the first winner for his acting work on Felista's Fable.

== Winners and nominees ==
The table shows the winners and nominees for the Best Actor in a Feature Film award.

Table key
indicates the winner

Year	Actor	Film	Ref.
2014 (2nd)	Isaac Kuddzu	The Felistas Fable	
2015 (3rd)	Farooq Mutebi	Call 112	
2015 (3rd)	Hassan Mageye	The Tailor	
2015 (3rd)	Hassan Spike Isingoma	The Boda Boda Thieves	
2015 (3rd)	Alex Kakooza	My Rising Sun	
2015 (3rd)	Ronnie Lugumba	Hanged For Love	
2016 (4th)	Hassan Mageye	Invisible Cuffs	
2016 (4th)	Mutebi Farooq	Ugandan Pollock	
2016 (4th)	Bobby Tamale	The Only Son	
2016 (4th)	Raymond Rushabiro	Freedom	
2016 (4th)	Robert Ernest Bbumba	American Dream	
2017 (5th)	Raymond Rushabiro	The Torture	
2017 (5th)	Samuel Rogers Masaaba	Devil's Chest	
2017 (5th)	Steven Ayeng	Kony: Order from Above	
2017 (5th)	T. West Ttabu Wasswa	Breaking with Customs	
2017 (5th)	Bbale Felix Bwanika	Faithful	
2018 (6th)	Raymond Rushabiro	Five Days To Live	
2018 (6th)	Kakeeto Rashi	Kikumi Kikumi	
2018 (6th)	Housen Mushema	Veronica's Wish	
2018 (6th)	Zziwa Ddungu Headmaster	Agreement	
2018 (6th)	T. West Ttabu Wasswa	Deranged	
2018 (6th)	Rodney Dhikusooka	Damage	
2018 (6th)	Rodney Dhikusooka	Hustle	
2019 (7th)	Patriq Nkakalukanyi	Lailah	
2019 (7th)	Michael Wawuyo Jr.	N.S.I.W.E	
2019 (7th)	Avan Kavy Kavuma	Country of Men	
2019 (7th)	Zizinga Patrick	Red Rats	

== Multiple wins and nominations ==
The following individuals have won multiple Best Best Actor in a Feature film:

Wins	Actor
2	Raymond Rushabiro

The following actors have received two or more Best Actor nominations

Nominations	Actor
3	Raymond Rushabiro
2	Farooq Mutebi
2	Hassan Mageye
2	T. West Ttabu Wasswa
2	Rodney Dhikusooka
