= Sanyu (TV series) =

Ugandan television series

- Genre: Drama
- Written by: Cissy Nalumansi; Arnold Mwaita; Kwezi Kaganda; Kosse Sandra; Kizza Richard Lugobwa; James Mumdrugo
- Directed by: Mathew Nabwiso
- Starring: Catherine Namugenyi; Timothy Lwanga; Farida Nabagereka; Blessing Naturinda; Kyeyune Shalom; Marion Asilo; Timothy Kibirango; Abby Mukiibi Nkaaga; Housen Mushema; Rachael Nduhukire; Eleanor Nabwiso; Deedan Muyira; Allan Katongole
- Theme music composer: Kenneth Mugabi
- Opening theme: Sanyu
- Ending theme: Sanyu
- Country of origin: Uganda
- Original language: English
- No. of seasons: 4
- No. of episodes: 880

Production
- Producers: Mathew Nabwiso; Eleanor Nabwiso
- Production locations: Kampala, Uganda

Original release
- Network: Pearl Magic
- Release: 2 January 2020 – present

Sanyu is a Ugandan drama television series that premiered on DStv Uganda's Pearl Magic Prime TV on 2 January 2020, at the premiere of MultiChoice Uganda's premium network, Pearl Magic Prime. The series stars Catherine Namugenyi in the lead role as Sanyu, along with Eleanor Nabwiso and Housen Mushema. Sanyu was nominated for Best Television Drama, and Tracy Kababiito was nominated for Best Actress in a Television Drama at the 8th Uganda Film Festival Awards.

== Synopsis ==
Sanyu Batte is an innocent, rural teenage girl. She is forced to leave her family and her pursuit of education to take a maid's job for a complex, wealthy urban family. Sanyu falls for the young son of her employer, which makes her life even harder.

== Plot ==
=== Season 1 ===
The Kirunda textile factory where Sanyu's father works is damaged by a fire. Nalweyiso, Sanyu's stepmother, forces Sanyu to sign a contract she hasn't read. It's a contract to work for the Kirunda family as a maid. Little did she know, life with the Kirundas was much more complicated than it appeared.

At the Kirundas', Sanyu finds the complicated family that owns Kirunda House of Designs. The youngest son of the family, Oscar Gume, falls for Sanyu, and she reciprocates his feelings, although she tries to hide them. She later helps troublesome Melissa, the youngest daughter of Linda Kirunda, with her outfit to appear on a magazine cover.

While the other maids, Karungi, Nanziri, and Kakai, enjoy Francis Kirunda's company, Sanyu doubts he's a good husband, as she had seen him in the company of Patience, whom Sanyu suspects to be his mistress. This is later proven right when Francis meets Patience in a hotel room; Patience then threatens to expose the truth to the media. To stop this, Francis takes her home, which annoys Linda, and she fights with Patience, causing her to stress out and leading her to drink. However, Sanyu stops her from consuming alcohol by advising her to draw and take orange juice instead. Patience lies about carrying Francis's baby, but Sanyu overhears her talking to a doctor to forge prenatal scans.

Oscar sees Sanyu's fashion designs, which are of very high quality, and suggests they are used in the Kirunda House of Designs. Later, Sanyu encounters Oscar's fiancée, Kirabo, who, out of insecurity, instantly hates her; Kirabo's brother Pius falls for Sanyu. Kirabo later leaves Oscar at the altar and runs away with business tycoon Steve.

The eldest son of the house, Patrick, and his wife, Lucy, attempt to steal Linda's assets but are unsuccessful. Sanyu and Linda partner and create designs, preparing for a fashion show. With maid Karungi's help, Lucy steals plans from Linda, makes the same clothes, and signs up to compete in the play. Lucy's models go first, and she is devastated when Linda's models wear completely different designs made by Sanyu; hence, Linda wins. But as the police arrest Lucy for theft, she accuses Sanyu of giving the plans to her, causing her imprisonment when not even Linda believes her.

Sanyu loses her job and meets her friend, Atwine, who started as an enemy, but after Sanyu saves her, they become good friends. Sanyu gets bailed out by her father, and she later gets a job at a Lightning design company, where her boss, George, falls for her and her designs. George is Oscar's cousin.

Later, Patrick starts drug abuse due to stress from Lucy, and Lucy desperately wants a child, yet she bears the curses of her abandoned child Kule. To prove her innocence to the Kirundas about the theft, Sanyu pretends to be "Sasha" and works as Oscar's assistant; as Sanyu, she still works as George's assistant.

=== Season 2 ===
"Sasha"'s double identity is exposed after Sasha leaves her bracelet at a crime scene; the bracelet is similar to one Sanyu wears. Pius notices the bracelet on Sanyu's hand; in a rage, he accidentally pulls off her wig, confirming that Sasha is Sanyu. Sanyu bangs Pius on the head, causing him to lose his memory. Kirabo then sees Sasha without her wig and exposes her in front of the Kirundas as Sanyu.

However, other than being surprised, George is instead amazed at the fact that she could run two different companies at the same time. George allows Sanyu to keep her job, and she starts living with her workmate and friend Anita. However, on the date they are supposed to clear their rental fees, burglars attack them and steal the money, so the landlady kicks her and Anita out of the house.

Patience, Kirunda's former mistress, comes up with a deal for George to help Adeyinka illegally export precious stones by putting them on clothes. Meanwhile, troublesome Mellissa gets drunk and hurts her eye as she returns home. Sanyu starts spending the night in the office, something George is furious about when he finds out, and he takes her to his apartment for shelter.

When Oscar sees Sanyu at George's apartment, he leaps to the conclusion that she is sleeping with George. In a rage, Mr. Batte asks Sanyu to marry George, as she is already "carrying his child." At first, Sanyu is reluctant to do this, but she later agrees. On the due date of their "kwanjula" (introduction ceremony), two things happen: Adeyinka's consignment is stolen by robbers, and George disappears. Everyone concludes Oscar has a hand in his disappearance.

== Cast ==
- Tracy Kababito - first Sanyu (Sn1)
- Catherine Namugenyi - Sanyu (Sn2 onwards)
- Allan Kutos Katongole - Oscar Gume
- Rachael Nduhukire - Melissa
- Marion Asilo Dorothy - Linda Mutesi Kirunda
- Abby Mukiibi Nkaaga - Mr Kirunda
- Housen Mushema - Patrick Nkemba
- Eleanor Nabwiso - Lucy Nkemba
- Mutumba Jenkins - Ddembe
- Allen Musumba - Nakakande
- Deedan Muyira - Atwine
- Sharon O Nalukenge - Kirabo
- Ethan Kavuma - George
- Timothy Lwanga
- Blessing Naturinda
- Timothy Kibirango
- Leila Kalanzi Kachapizo - Abimala
- Nalule Winningstone Trinnie - Jesca

== Episodes ==
=== Series overview ===
Season	Episodes	Originally aired	
Season	Episodes	First aired	Last aired
1	100	February 8, 2021	June 25, 2021
2	260	June 28, 2021	June 24, 2022
3	260	June 27, 2022	June 23, 2023
4	260	June 26, 2023	June 26, 2024
