= Prickly Roses =

Ugandan drama film

- Film poster
- Directed by: Mathew Nabwiso
- Produced by: Mboowa Swaadiqu
- Starring: Hellen Lukoma; Bwanika Baale Felix; Eleanor Nabwiso; Sarafina Muhawenimana
- Music by: Rachael Magoola (Obangaina)
- Production company: Nabwiso Films
- Release date: 13 February 2020 (Kampala)
- Country: Uganda
- Language: English

Prickly Roses is a Ugandan drama film produced by Eleanor Nabwiso and directed by Mathew Nabwiso at Nabwiso Films in association with Akina Mama Wa Afrika, supported by Hivos. It stars Hellen Lukoma as Nankya, Eleanor Nabwiso as Nazziwa and Sarafina Muhawenimana as Kezia.

== Summary ==
Nankya, Kezia and Nazziwa are poor young women working at a flower farm in Uganda. They have to deal with harsh working conditions at work and return home to face even more hardships. Nankya fights to break the chauvinistic chain.

== Premier ==
The film premiered on 13 February 2020 in Kampala under the campaign "Women @ Work". It explores the working conditions under which women work on flower gardens in Uganda in contrast with the cash value of the flowers on the market in Uganda and abroad. The film was set to open in theaters in Uganda in March 2020, but all theaters were closed due to the coronavirus pandemic that had reached Uganda in March 2020.

== Cast ==
- Hellen Lukoma as Nankya
- Eleanor Nabwiso as Nazziwa
- Sarafina Muhawenimana as Kezia
- Bareija Collins Emeka as Drake
- Johnmary Sekimpi as Bonny
- Aisha Namawejje as Maggie
- Rukiss Salameda as Namutebi
- Bwanika Baale Felix as Sebunya
- Amanya Alvin as baby
- Paige Naikumi as Young Nankya
