= Bed of Thorns =

Ugandan drama film

Bed of Thorns (#Tosirika)
- Directed by: Eleanor Nabwiso
- Starring: Malaika; Michael Wawuyo Jr.; Agnes Kebirungi; Sarah Kisawuzi; Housen Mushema; Diana Kahunde; Martha Kay; Patrick Salvador Idringi
- Production company: Nabwiso Films
- Release date: 30 March 2019 (Kampala)
- Country: Uganda
- Language: English

Bed of Thorns (#Tosirika) is a Ugandan, all-female crew produced drama film directed by Eleanor Nabwiso under the Nabwiso Films banner. The film addresses the issue of gender-based and domestic violence. It stars media personality Malaika Tenshi Nnyanzi, Diana Kahunde, youtuber and social media comedian Martha Kay, Agnes Kebirungi, Michael Wawuyo Jr., Housen Mushema, Sara Kisawuzi and Patrick Salvador Idringi. The film premiered on 30 March 2019 at a red carpet event at Century Cinema Kamwokya, Kampala.

== In Cinema ==
Bed of Thorns was screened on the premier night at Century Cinemax at Acacia Mall in Kampala, at the Uganda National Cultural Centre. It screened at the London Arthouse Film Festival on 12 August 2019.

== Production ==
The film was produced by an all female crew and production started in March 2019. It was marketed with the #Tosirika (Don't keep quiet) to raise awareness about violence against women as a celebration of the women's month of March. The film was both Martha Kay's and Mailaika's film acting debut.

== Reception ==
The film was well received as it tackled everyday issues affecting women in relationships. In fact, after the film was released, one of the supporting actresses Diana Kahunde came out as a victim of psychological violence in her own marriage by her husband and family. The film received the Africa Focus Award for Best Feature Film award at the London Arthouse Film Festival in the UK.

== Awards ==
Awards & Nominations
Year	Award	Category	Received by	Result	Ref
2019	Uganda Film Festival Awards	Best Script (Screenplay)	Daphne Ampiire	Won	
2019	Uganda Film Festival Awards	Best Actress	Malaika	Won	
2019	Uganda Film Festival Awards	Best Supporting Actor in a Feature Film	Michael Wawuyo Jr.	Nominated	
2019	Uganda Film Festival Awards	Best Supporting Actress in a Feature Film	Diana Kahunde	Nominated	
2019	Uganda Film Festival Awards	Best Director	Eleanor Nabwiso	Nominated	
2019	Uganda Film Festival Awards	Best Feature Film	Eleanor Nabwiso	Nominated	
2019	London Arthouse Film Festival	Africa Focus Award for Best Feature Film	Eleanor Nabwiso	Won	
