= November Tear =

Ugandan drama film

- Directed by: Richard Nondo
- Written by: Richard Nondo
- Starring: Daphne Ampire; Joel Okuyo Atiku Prynce: Raymond Rushabiro; Cindy Sanyu; Housen Mushema
- Cinematography: Joel Okuyo Atiku Prynce
- Music by: Andrew Ahuurra
- Release date: 11 August 2019
- Country: Uganda
- Language: English

November Tear is a Ugandan film written and directed by Richard Nondo and stars Daphne Ampire, Joel Okuyo Atiku Prynce, Raymond Rushabiro, Cindy Sanyu and Housen Mushema (as Ziraba). It premiered on August 11, 2019, at Century Cinema in Kampala.

== Plot ==
November Tear tells the story of Anenda (played by Daphine Ampire) who is forced out of home by her stepmother. While on a journey to find her late mother's kinsmen, she is engulfed in the harsh reality of sex slavery. The film covers the silent but dangerous activity of trafficking of women that became common in 2018 and early 2019.

== Other cast ==
- Susan Kaylie Busingye - as Miriam
- Bryan Byamukama - as Ghetto Boy
- Grace Gashumba - as Rema
- Milka Irene - as Mama Anenda
- Eyangu James - as Barman
- Sarafina Muhawenimana - as Ruth
- Natukunda Vastine Abwooki - as Twinomugisha
- River Dan Rugaju - as Turyamureeba
- Bangi Solome
- Cindy Sanyu
- Raymond Rushabiro
- Joel Okuyo Prynce - as Mwene
- Mushema Housen - as Ziraba

== External ==
- November Tear at IMDb
