= Felistas =

Felistas may refer to

- Felistas Muzongondi (born 1986), Zimbabwean association football player
- The Felistas Fable, a 2013 Ugandan film
