= Rehema Nanfuka =

Ugandan actress, director (born 1986)

- Born: 25 May 1986 (age 40); Uganda
- Citizenship: Ugandan
- Education: Makerere University; Kibuli Secondary School
- Occupations: Actress; Director; Producer; Screenwriter
- Years active: 2008–present
- Awards: Africa Movie Academy Award for Most Promising Actress in 2010; Best Actress Award at the African Film Festival of Cordoba, Spain in 2010; Best Actress in TV Drama; Best Director

Rehema Nanfuka (born 25 May 1986) is a Ugandan film, theatre and television actress, director, and filmmaker known for her roles in Imani, Veronica's Wish, Imbabazi, The Girl in the Yellow Jumper, Queen of Katwe, and Imperial Blue, among other films.

She won the Best Director award at the 2018 Uganda Film Festival Awards, becoming the first female director to ever win an award in this category at any of the awarding bodies in Uganda.

== Career ==
=== Film and television ===
Rehema started her acting career in Mira Nair's Maisha Film Lab's 2008 production, Downcast where she played a housewife.

Her breakout role as Mary the maid in Imani won her two awards; the Africa Movie Academy Award for Most Promising Actress in 2010 sharing the win with Chelsea Eze and Best Actress Award at the African Film Festival of Cordoba, Spain in 2010. The film also won an Africa Movie Academy Award for Best Film in an African Language. Rehema also received recognition from the Variety critic Boyd Van Hoeij who wrote, "Rehema Nanfuka, as a distressed maid in the second-best segment, impresses with her quiet sense of dignity." The Hollywood Reporter critic Neil Young wrote, "Nanfuka and Buyi are engaging performers and cope well with underwritten characters."

In 2013, she starred in Joel Karekezi's Imbabazi, The Pardon, a film about the Rwanda genocide, in which she was nominated for the Best Actress award at the Festival du Cinéma Africain de Khouribga, Morocco 2015.

Rehema starred as Suzanna in Yat Madit in 2016 alongside Gladys Oyenbot and Michael Wawuyo Jr. For this role, she won the award for Best Actress TV at the Uganda Film Festival in 2017.

Nanfuka directed the 2018 award-winning film Veronica's Wish for which she won the Best Director Award at the Uganda Film Festival 2018 in Kampala, becoming the first female to win the accolade in Uganda. The film also received eight other awards out of the twelve nominations.

=== Theatre ===
On the theatre stage, Rehema's earlier roles were in plays staged at the National Theatre. She starred as Lady Macbeth in the play Macbeth and received critical acclaim for her performance from Daily Monitor critic Brian Magoba as well as The Observer critic Polly Komukama, who wrote, "Rehema Nanfuka put up the best performance as the evil Lady Macbeth."

In 2015, she played Dorra and Kate in The Body of a Woman as a Battlefield in the Bosnian War a play by Romanian-French playwright by Matei Visniec and Judith Adong's Ga-Ad! Her other notable theatre credits include The Laramie Project, Tropical Fish (book), Jean Paul Sartre's No Exit, Just me you and the silence and the river and the mountain.

Rehema was one of the voice actors in The Cow Needs a Wife, a play that was streamed on the BBC African Performance programme in 2010.

Rehema's story has been featured on The Moth. And as a spoken word artist Rehema featured in the Goethe Institut's Africa spoken word project. She emerged winner of the Kampala Slam 2013.

Rehema has also received endorsements for commercials for Airtel Uganda, Airtel Malawi, Milkman Uganda, and ECO Bank Uganda.

Rehema plays Lisa Borera in an upcoming film Kafa Coh and Nkinzi in Nana Kagga's upcoming TV series, Reflections.

== Education ==
Rehema went to Kibuli Secondary School, then Makerere University, Uganda's oldest university where she obtained a degree in International Business. She is also an alumna of Maisha Film Lab.

== Nominations and awards ==
Awards
Year	Award	Category	Result
2018	Uganda Film Festival Awards	Best Director (Veronica's Wish)	Won
2017	Uganda Film Festival Awards	Best Actress in a TV Drama in Yat Madit	Won
2015	Festival du Cinéma Africain de Khouribga, Morocco	Best Actress (The Pardon –role)	Nominated
2013	Goethe Institute spoken word project, Africa	Best spoken word Artist in Kampala	Won
2010	African Film Festival of Cordoba, Spain	Best Actress Film Award (Imani- role)	Won
2010	Africa Movie Academy Awards, Nigeria	Most Promising Actress (Imani- role)	Won

== Filmography ==
=== Film ===
Year	Film	Role				Notes
Year	Film	Actor	Director	Writer	Producer	Notes
2022	Kafa Coh	Lisa Borera				Directed by Gilbert K. Lukalia; Produced by Doreen Mirembe
2020	The Girl in the Yellow Jumper	Dorothy				Thriller
2018	Veronica's Wish		Yes			
2018	Imperial Blue	Angela Mbira				Drama / Fantasy / Thriller
2018	Facing North	Stella				Short
2018	5 Yogera shorts		Yes	Yes		
2017	Kyenvu	Taxi gossip				Short film
2017	Tebandeke's Dream			Yes	Yes	Documentary
2017	Papi (film)	Mother				
2015	Queen of Katwe	Nurse				Walt Disney Studios Motion Pictures
2015	King of Darkness	Doctor				
2013	The-Pardon (Imbabazi)	Alice				
2013	The Road We Travel	Housewife				
2013	Haunted Souls	Apoto Grace			Yes	
2013	Nico the Donkey			Yes	Yes	
2013	4G Spirit		Yes			Documentary
2010	Imani (film)	Mary				Won two awards; Best Actress Tarifa Africa film festival and Most promising actress at the AMAAs
2010	Estranged	Single mother				
2009	The Pardon	Alice				Maisha Film Lab
2008	Down Cast	Housewife				Maisha Film Lab
2008	Sins of the Parents	Mama Junior				Short
2007	Down This Road I Walk	Receptionist				Production company: Trendz Studios

=== Television ===
Year	Television Series	Role				Notes
Year	Television Series	Actor	Director	Writer	Producer	Notes
2018	Export Baby (Episode 2)	Mother forced to sell baby				NPO 1 Dutch Public Broadcasting
2018	Reflections	Nkinzi				Savannah Moon Pictures
2016	Yat Madit	Suzanna				Media Focus on Africa
2014	Love Makanika	Lead				Dilstories
2011	Fruits of love	Eldest daughter				IVAD Productions
2010	Kakibe ki!	Lead				NTV Uganda

=== Theatre ===
Year	Production	Role				Notes
Year	Production	Actor	Director	Writer	Producer	Notes
2019	Niqabi Ninja	Hana				
2018	The Slay Queens of Africa Musical		Yes			Afroman Spice
2018	Adoption	Wife				
2018	We are back! Destiny Africa 2018 tour		Yes			
2017	Tropical Fish	Solo Performer	Yes			
2017	Just You, Me and the Silence	Wife/Journalist				
2017	My life in a coloured box	Solo performer				
2017	TVET		Yes			For Belgium embassy
2016	The Laramie Project	Journalist/ Student /Lecturer				
2016	Ga-AD!	Faith – Secretary				
2016	One Man, One Wife		Yes			(Laba Fest)
2015	The body of a woman as a Battlefield in the Bosnian war	Dorra and Kate				
2015	Betrayal in the City		Yes			
2015	Visions of Destiny		Yes	Yes		
2013	Macbeth	Lady Macbeth				
2012	The River and the Mountain	Pastor				
2011	No Exit	Estelle				
2010	The cow needs a wife	Blind Janat				BBC African Performance Program
