= New Intentions =

- Directed by: Kennedy Kihire
- Written by: Kennedy Kihire
- Screenplay by: Kennedy Kihire
- Produced by: Kennedy Kihire
- Starring: Ife Piankhi; Sinovella Night; Kawooya Malcolm; Joel Okuyo Atiku; Usama Mukwaya; Doreen Mirembe
- Cinematography: Rwakoma Eric
- Edited by: Anthony Gwaro
- Music by: Giovanni Kiyingi
- Production company: Kihiray Pictures
- Release date: 3 May 2016 (National Theatre Uganda)
- Running time: 72 minutes
- Country: Uganda
- Language: English

New Intentions is a Ugandan film written and directed by Kennedy Kihire starring Ife Piankhi, Sinovella Night, Kawooya Malcolm, and Joel Okuyo Atiku. The film was released on 3 May 2016 at Uganda National Cultural Centre (UNCC). The film is nominated in six categories at the 2016 Uganda Film Festival including Best Screenplay, Best Sound, Best cinematography, Film of the Year, Best lead Actress and Best Feature Film, Best film director/Film of year.

== Plot ==
A couple of bankers decide to be foster parents when they adopt an orphaned girl “Wellona” after discovering billions of money in her name at their bank. The money that she by default inherited from her deceased parents. In adopting her unaware of her own worth, they believe they will get an awesome share of the money. Unfortunately, the foster mother falls ill in a coma for months, then their master plan drastically changes to a journey of lust, secrecy and betrayal where pretty Wellona falls a victim and has to endure.

== Cast ==
- Ife Piankhi as Mrs. Siki Margaret
- John Wayne Muganza as Mr. Benon
- Joel Okuyo Atiku as Counsel Douglas
- Sinovella Night as Wellona
- Kawooya Malcolm as Blake
- Usama Mukwaya as Bruno
- Abha Kalsi as Mama Kamlha
- Doreen Mirembe as Favour
- Kasingye Aaron as Lenon
- Tugume Benon as Teacher
- Yusuf Boxa Kaija as Man 1
- Agum Evangeline as Perttida
- Justine Nantongo as Linda
- Edlyn Sabrina as Bank Manager
- Geofrey Nyende as Counsel Nyende
- Provia Nangobi as Madam Lilian
- Angella Mwesigwa as Diane

== Awards ==
=== Nominated ===
- 2016: Best Screenplay, Best Sound, Best Best Cinematography, Best lead Actress and Best Feature Film, Best film director/Film of year - Uganda Film Festival Awards

== See also ==
- Balikoowa in the City
