= Uganda Film Festival Award for Best Actress in a Feature Film =

Category of film award

- Awarded for: Excellence in Cinematic Acting Achievement
- Country: Uganda
- Presented by: Uganda Communications Commission (UCC)

The Uganda Film Festival Award for Best Actress is an award presented annually by Uganda Communications Commission (UCC) at the Uganda Film Festival. It is given in honor of a female actor (actress) who has exhibited outstanding acting while working in the film industry in Uganda. The award was introduced in 2014.

== Winners and nominees ==
The table shows the winners and nominees for the Best Actor in a Feature Film award. In 2015, two actresses Farida Kutesa and Nisha Kalema co-won the award, the only time the award was shared by two contenders.

Table key
indicates the winner

Year	Actress	Film	Ref.
2014 (2nd)	Farida Kuteesa		
2015 (3rd)	Farida Kuteesa	House Arrest	
2015 (3rd)	Nisha Kalema	The Tailor	
2015 (3rd)	Deby Wadsen	Hanged For Love	
2015 (3rd)	Nanziri Fausta	Galz About Town	
2016 (4th)	Nisha Kalema	Freedom	
2016 (4th)	Tania Shakira Kankindi	Invisible Cuffs	
2016 (4th)	Regina Amoding	The Ring	
2016 (4th)	Ife Pianchi	New Intentions	
2017 (5th)	Joan Agaba	The Torture	
2017 (5th)	Hasifah N. Nakitende	Devil's Chest	
2017 (5th)	Eleanor Nabwiso	Rain	
2017 (5th)	Lilian Cherimo Nabunjo	Breaking with Customs	
2017 (5th)	Aganza Kisaka	Faithful	
2017 (5th)	Aganza Kisaka	Break In	
2018 (6th)	Nisha Kalema	Veronica's Wish	
2018 (6th)	Cindy Sanyu	Bella	
2018 (6th)	Nabakooza Patricia	Jackie and the Gene	
2018 (6th)	Nabakooza Patricia	The Only Bridge	
2018 (6th)	Coutinho Kemiyondo	Kyenvu	
2019 (7th)	Malaika	Bed of Thorns	
2019 (7th)	Nalubega Josephine	Taste of Faith	
2019 (7th)	Nabasumba Moureen	Lailah	
2019 (7th)	Nalukwago Shadia	Grade 7 Girl	
2023 (10th)	Nana Kagga	Pieces of Me	
2023 (10th)	Doreen Mirembe	Kafa Coh	
2023 (10th)	Tracy Kababiito	Mukisa	
2023 (10th)	Doreck Ankunda	When You Become Me	
2023 (10th)	Tania Shakirah Kankindi	All For Love/Atonement	

== Multiple wins and nominations ==
The following individuals have won multiple Best Best Actress in a Feature film:

Wins	Actress
3	Nisha Kalema

The following actresses have received two or more Best Actress nominations

Nominations	Actress
3	Nisha Kalema
2	Farida Kuteesa
2	Aganza Kisaka
2	Nabakooza Patricia
