= Rain (2016 film) =

Ugandan drama film

- Directed by: Daniel Mugerwa
- Written by: Mary Nyanzi
- Produced by: Eleanor Nabwiso; Mathew Nabwiso
- Starring: Eleanor Nabwiso; Phillip Luswata; Mathew Nabwiso; Joanita Bewulira; Joel Okuyo Atiku; Richard Tuwangye; Elizabeth Bwamimpeke
- Cinematography: Ken Height Sabiiti
- Edited by: Ken Height Sabiiti
- Music by: Ruth Grace
- Production companies: Crane Media Productions; Nabwiso Films; Qeyrem Motion Studios Nabwiso Films
- Release date: August 20, 2016 (Worldwide)
- Country: Uganda
- Language: English

Rain is a Ugandan 2016 drama film directed by Daniel Mugerwa, written by Mary Nyanzi and produced by Eleanor and Mathew Nabwiso. The film was released on 20 August 2016 in Kampala and stars Eleanor Nabwiso, Mathew Nabwiso, Joel Okuyo Atiku, Phillip Luswata and Joanita Bewulira. The film received numerous awards in Uganda and abroad and won Best Women’s Rights Film award at the London Eye International Festival, organised and run by London Film Network Ltd at the Terbanacle Theater in London, Best Actress in East African and Best First time Director from FESTICAB a film festival in Burundi, Best Film in Africa and Middle East award from NUREN film festival in China and Best Screenplay at Uganda Film Festival Awards in Uganda.

== Summary ==
Rain is a young girl who comes from Masaka to Kampala in the hopes of becoming a shining music star. Her dream is soon shuttered when someone in the music industry makes her pregnant and infects her with HIV.

== Production ==
Rain was Eleanor and Mathew Nabwio’s first production after they acted together on The Hostel, where they started their relationship and got married. They had started a new production company called Nabwiso Films, and Rain was the first project produced under their company. The film was also co-produced in association with Crane Media Productions, Heights Montage, Qeyrem Motion Pictures.

== Awards and nominations ==
Awards & Nominations
Year	Award	Category	Received by	Result	Ref
2017	Uganda Film Festival Awards	Best Script (Screenplay)		Won	
2017	Uganda Film Festival Awards	Best Actress	Eleanor Nabwiso	Nominated	
2017	Uganda Film Festival Awards	Best Feature Film	Daniel Mugerwa	Nominated	
2017	Uganda Film Festival Awards	Best Director	Daniel Mugewa	Nominated	
2017	London Eye International Festival’	Best Women's Rights Film		Won	
