= Housen Mushema =

Ugandan model, actor

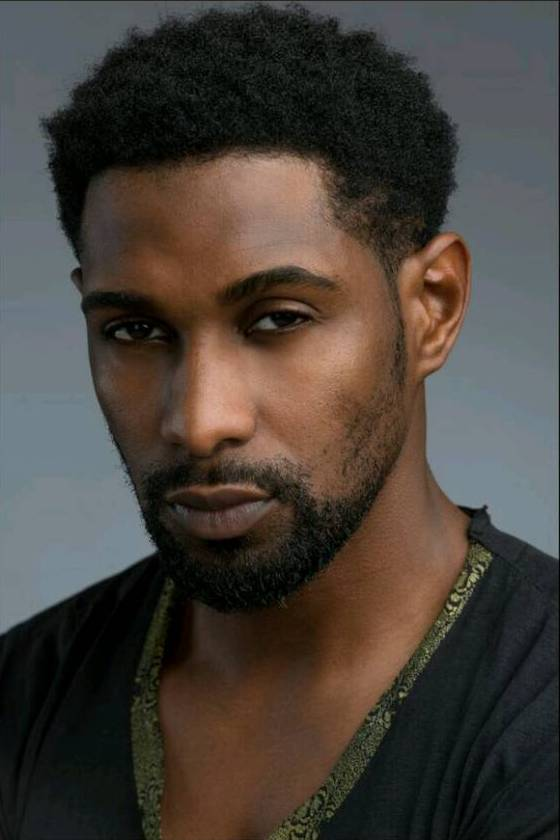
- Mushema in 2018
- Born: March 29, 1992; Jinja, Uganda
- Education: ESRA International Film School; Makerere University
- Occupations: Model, actor, fashion producer
- Years active: 2013–present
- Modeling information
- Height: 5 ft 11 in (180 cm)
- Hair color: Black
- Eye color: Brown
- Agency: Joram Model Management Uganda (2016–2017)

Housen Mushema is a Ugandan runway, commercial and editorial model, actor and fashion producer known for playing the lead role of Balikoowa in Balikoowa in the City, Sokke in The Hostel, Andrew in Second Chance, Ben Ssali in Power of Legacy, Ian in Mistakes Girls Do, Michael in Veronica's Wish, Anthony in Bed of Thorns, in addition to roles in other shows and films, including November Tear, False Dreams and The Lukkas.

He is a recipient of the Abyranz Fashion and Style Awards 2015 in the Outstanding Male Model category. He has been featured in several "Man Crush Monday" segments in magazines in Kampala. He was listed at number seven on Satisfashion Ug magazine's "The 8 most revered male models in Kampala" in 2014.

== Career ==
=== Modeling ===
Housen started modeling in 2013 while in his second year at Makerere University after his father became ill, forcing him to find a job to pay for his tuition. His first modeling job was as an usher at events before walking the runway or appearing in magazines. He was signed by Joram Model Management in 2015.

In 2015, Housen won an award for the Most Outstanding Male Model Uganda at the Abryanz Style and Fashion Awards. He has worked at a number of shows both local and international, including Kampala Fashion Week 2014, PurpleRyan Hub, Malengo Fashion Show, Swahili Fashion Week, The bride and Groom Expo.(2014 and 2016), Genesis Night by Hellen Lukoma (2014) and Abryanz Style and Fashion Awards (2013–2015). He has also appeared and done photo shoots for magazines in Uganda, including Bride and Groom Magazine and Flair.

He has worked with numerous designers including Jose Hendo (New York), Martha Jabo (Uganda), Motions (Rwanda), and Emolsam_DNA.

He produced the Hijab and Kanzu fashion show in 2016 and co-produced The Vintage fashion show alongside his boss Joram Muzira in 2017.

=== Acting ===
Housen debuted his acting career in Shakespeare's play Macbeth in 2014. In the same year he got a regular role on the fourth season of The Hostel (Serenity) produced by Fast Truck Productions, where he played Sokke. The television series aired on NTV Uganda.

In 2016, he got a lead role as Balikoowa in the local comedy-drama series Balikoowa in the City another production by Fast Track Productions which aired on Spark TV.

In May 2017, Housen took over the role of Andrew Masa from the original actor in the telenovela Second Chance, a Ugandan remake of Telemundo's El Cuerpo del Deseo. Second Chance aired on NTV UG and was produced by Phaz Pictures and NTV Uganda.

Housen was later cast as Mckenzie Mulumba in Reflections, a series directed and produced by Nana Kagga, alongside Malayika Nnyanzi, Cleopatra Koheirwe, Gladys Oyenbot and Andrew Kyamagero.

He has also appeared in several music videos, including "Otubattisa" by Irene Ntale and Sheebah Karungi in 2014 and "Kyaana gwe" by Leila Kayondo in 2017.

Mushema's debut film role was a leading role as Michael in a 2018 drama film Veronica's Wish, for which he received his first nomination. He was nominated for Best Actor in a Leading Role at the Uganda Film Awards 2018.

== Personal life ==
Housen was born in Jinja and raised in Bweyogerere. He is a devout Muslim and the fourth and youngest child in his family. His father was a prominent tailor in Kampala, which introduced him to fashion.

== Filmography ==
=== Film ===
Year	Film	Role	Notes
2024	Makula		Directed by Mugisha Dan & Nisha Kalema
2023	Victim 30	Bagzy	Directed by Bash Mutumba
2019	Bed of Thorns	Anthony	A Nabwiso Films production directed by Eleanor Nabwiso
2019	November Tear	Zilaba	Directed by Richard Nondo
2018	Veronica's Wish	Michael	A Nisha Kalema film

=== Television series ===
Year	TV series	Role	Notes
2024	Prefects		
2021-2024	Sanyu	Patrick	TV series aired on Pearl Magic Prime
2020 -	The Lukkas		Pearl Magic series
2020 -	False Dreams	Duncan	Pearl Magic original series
2019 -	Power of Legacy	Ben Ssali	NTV series 18 episodes
2017 -	Mistakes Girls Do	Ian	TV series
2017	Reflections	Mckenzie Mulumba	TV series created and directed by Nana Kagga Macpherson
2016–2018	Second Chance	Andrew Masa	telenovela and remake of El Cuerpo del Deseo
2016–2017	Balikoowa in the City	Balikoowa	Comedy-drama produced by Fastrack Productions
2011–2015	The Hostel (TV series)	Sokke	Fourth season (Serenity)

=== Theater ===
Year	TV Series	Role	Notes
2019	Love Neega	Josh	AMK Productions by Misfits
2014	The Tragedy of Macbeth		Play by William Shakespeare

=== Music videos ===
Year	Song	Artist(s)
2019	"Yodi Yodi"	Afrie
2017	"Kyanagwe"	Leila Kayondo
2014	"Otubattisa"	Irene Ntale and Sheebah

== Nominations and awards ==
Awards
Year	Award	Category	Result
2021	Janzi Awards	Outstanding Actor	Won
2019	ZAFAA Global Awards	Best Lead Actor Male	Nominated
2018	Uganda Film Festival Awards (UFF)	Best Actor (Film)	Nominated
2017	Abryanz Style and Fashion Awards	Male Model of the year (Uganda)	Nominated
2015	Abryanz Style and Fashion Awards	Outstanding Male Model Uganda	Won
