= Devil's Chest =

Ugandan drama film

Devil’s Chest
- Film poster
- Directed by: Hassan Mageye
- Written by: Hassan Mageye
- Produced by: Hassan Mageye
- Starring: Hasifah Nande Nakitende; Samuel Rogers Masaaba
- Production companies: New Cinema Productions; Sanyuka Efrican Ent.
- Release dates: 10 June 2017 (Gulu); 5 May 2019 (Kabuusu Kampala)
- Country: Uganda
- Languages: English, Swahili

Devil's Chest is a 2017 Ugandan war film about the Lord's Resistance Army insurgency in northern Uganda. It was written, produced and directed by Hassan Mageye and stars Hasifah Nande Nakitende and Samuel Rogers Masaaba in the lead roles. It premiered in Gulu in October 2017 and in Kampala in May 2019.

== Summary ==
During the Lords Resistance Army (LRA) in northern Uganda, a village woman is forced to be a wife of the rebel leader Joseph Kony, the man who killed her husband. She becomes a soldier and fights for her freedom.

== Reception ==
The film was well received in Uganda and across Africa for its story, acting and direction. It received the most nominations (nine) at the 5th Uganda Film Festival Awards in 2017 and won four awards including Best Feature Film and Best Director. It was also nominated at the 2018 Africa Magic Viewers' Choice Awards (AMVCA) awards for Best Movie East African and Best Overall Movie. Some of the technical, story and action aspects of the film were however criticised. Collins Kakwezi of Amakula Film Festival called the film a botched project citing that the action scenes were lacking and that the rebel leader, Joseph Kony was portrayed as a kind man through actor Samuel Rogers Masaaba.

== Awards ==
Awards & Nominations
Year	Award	Category	Received by	Result	Ref
2017	Uganda Film Festival Awards	Best Script (Screenplay)	Hassan Mageye	Nominated	
2017	Uganda Film Festival Awards	Best Costume and Production Design	Hassan Mageye	Nominated	
2017	Uganda Film Festival Awards	Best Cinematography	Hassan Mageye	Won	
2017	Uganda Film Festival Awards	Best Sound	Hassan Mageye	Won	
2017	Uganda Film Festival Awards	Best Editing and Post Production	Hassan Mageye	Won	
2017	Uganda Film Festival Awards	Best Actress	Hasifah Nande Nakitende	Nominated	
2017	Uganda Film Festival Awards	Best Actor in a Feature Film	Samuel Rogers Masaaba	Nominated	
2017	Uganda Film Festival Awards	Best Director	Hassan Mageye	Won	
2017	Uganda Film Festival Awards	Best Feature Film	Hassan Mageye	Won	
2018	Africa Magic Viewers' Choice Awards	Best Movie East Africa		Nominated	
2018	Africa Magic Viewers' Choice Awards	Best Overall Movie		Nominated	
2018	Amakula Film Festival	Best Feature Film		Nominated	
