= The Felistas Fable =

- Directed by: Dilman Dila
- Written by: Dilman Dila
- Produced by: Dilman Dila; Nathan Magoola; Reiza S Degito
- Starring: Veronica Namanda; Joanita Bewulira-Wandera; Isaac Kaddzu; Gerald Rutaro; Murungi Tibba; Michael Wawuyo
- Cinematography: Cyril Ducottet
- Edited by: Jonathan Ojok
- Music by: Harry II Lwanga; Ikoce; Joseph Ochom
- Production company: Dilstories
- Release date: January 26, 2013 (Göteborg International Film Festival)
- Running time: 90 minutes.
- Country: Uganda
- Language: English

The Felistas Fable is a 2013 Ugandan film written, directed and produced by Dilman Dila. The film stars Veronica Namanda, Mike Wawuyo, Kaddzu Isaac and Mathew Nabwiso.

== Plot ==
Felistas is cursed. She stinks. No one can stand to stay near her. She lives in seclusion in an abandoned house. One day, a witchdoctor finds a solution to her problems. A cry-baby man can inherit the smell from her. Felistas is hesitant to grab the opportunity, because she does not want another person to go through the same pain she has endured. But she longs to reunite with her husband and child. So she kidnaps a man, Dan, who is a virgin desperate to get married. Dan recently got a job that makes him very rich. This attracts the attention of Kate, a gold-digger who he has wooed for a long time, and that of a corrupt cop, Jomba, who frames him for murder in an extortion scheme. As Felistas races against time to deliver Dan to the witch and win back her husband’s love, it turns into a high-energy chase with a voluptuous Kate and a trigger-happy Jomba hot on her tail.

== Cast ==
- Veronica Namanda as Felistas
- Kuddzu Isaac as Dan
- Tibba Murungi as Kate
- Gerald Rutaro as Jomba
- Joanitta Bewulira-Wandera as Mama Dan
- Raymond Kayemba as Kiza
- Michael Wawuyo as Kuku
- Esther Bwanika as Miria
- Gamba Lee as John
- Nandaula Zam Zam as Jean
- Wilberforce Mutetete as Police
- Oyugi Jackson Otim as Driver
- Mathew Nabwiso as Fred
- Opio Henry Opolot as Ogwang
- Mate Jackson as Priest
- Juliet Akanyijuka as Hr
- Kyarisiima Allen as Junior
- Nalubowa Aidah as Vendor
- Wagaba Dauda as Idler
- Mataze Charles as Spy
- Kazibwe Edwin as Son

== Critical reception ==
The Felistas Fable won two nominations at the Africa Movie Academy Awards for Best First Feature by a Director, and for Best Make-up Artist. It was also nominated for the African Magic Viewers Choice Awards 2014 for Best Make-up Artist. It won four awards at the Uganda Film Festival Awards 2014, for (Best Screenplay), (Best Actor),(Best Feature Film), and (Best Director/Film of the Year).

== Awards ==
- Winner of Film of the Year (Best Director) at the Uganda Film Festival 2014.
- Winner of Best Feature Film at the Uganda Film Festival 2014
- Winner of Best Screenplay at the Uganda Film Festival 2014
- Winner best actor (Kuddzu Isaac)at the Uganda Film Festival 2014
- Winner overall film of the year at the Uganda Film Festival 2014.
- Nominated for Best First Feature by a Director at the Africa Movie Academy Awards 2014
- Nominated for Best Make-up Artist at the Africa Movie Academy Awards 2014 and at the African Magic Views Choice Awards, 2014
