= Yat Madit =

- Genre: Drama
- Written by: Aciro Patricia
- Directed by: Media Focus on Africa
- Starring: Michael Wawuyo; Michael Wawuyo Jr. Patriq Nkakalukanyi; Rehema Nanfuka; Nisha Kalema; Oyenbot; Kavin Mugisha; William Otako; Brenda Awor; Gloria Namboozo; Edwin Mukalazi
- Narrated by: Michael Wawuyo (Ochan)
- Country of origin: Uganda
- Original language: English
- No. of seasons: 1
- No. of episodes: 13

Production
- Executive producer: Mburugu Gikunda
- Camera setup: Multiple-camera setup
- Running time: 25 minutes
- Production companies: Media Focus on Africa (MFA); European Union

Original release
- Network: NTV Uganda
- Release: December 8, 2016 – 2017

Yat Madit is a Ugandan drama television series directed by Irene Kulabako and starring Michael Wawuyo (Senior), Michael Wawuyo Jr., Nisha Kalema, Rehema Nanfuka, Oyenbot and Patriq Nkakalukanyi.

The series was produced by Media Focus on Africa (MFA) and premiered on NTV Uganda on December 8, 2016. The European Union funded the project in partnership with ICCO cooperation and the DOEN Foundation.

The series was made to promote intercultural dialogue and peace in post-conflict communities in North and North Eastern Uganda and to demonstrate alternative ways of dealing with conflicts. Media Focus on Africa produced the script with Ugandan writers after conducting dialogue session in communities in Acholi, Lango, Teso and Karamoja to understand post-conflict issues and challenges due to Joseph Kony’s Lord’s Resistance Army war. Following public screenings of the series, MFA held 60 dialogue sessions across Northern and Eastern Uganda to discuss the series and its impact in providing productive approaches to reconciliation.

The title Yat Madit means ‘a big tree’ as a reference to where the community gathers to discuss and solve problems.

== Plot ==
Inspired by real-life stories of war, conflict, and recovery borne out of the Lord's Resistance Army insurgency, the narrative centers on Yat Madit, a fictional, multi-cultural community in Northern or Northeastern Uganda as it seeks to heal from the aftermath of war. The story focuses on how the community seeks to unite, transcending cultural and tribal divisions.

== Production ==
The series was set in a remote village in Kiboga, where the film crew settled for three months of filming.

== Awards and nominations ==
Awards and nominations
Year	Award	Category	Result	Ref
2017	Uganda Film Festival Awards	Best Female Actress in a TV Drama (Rehema Nanfuka)	Won	
2017	Uganda Film Festival Awards	Best Actor in a TV Drama (Michael Wawuyo Jr.)	Won	
2017	Uganda Film Festival Awards	Best TV Drama	Won	
