= False Dreams =

Ugandan television series

- Genre: Drama series
- Created by: Phad Mutumba
- Starring: Housen Mushema; Joy Agaba; Stella Nante; Derek Bakali; Alexon Audax; Martha Kay; Stellah Nantumbwe; Elizabeth Bwamimpeke; Rachel K
- Theme music composer: Yiruma
- Opening theme: Kiss the Rain
- Ending theme: Kiss the Rain
- Country of origin: Uganda
- Original language: English
- No. of seasons: 1

Production
- Producer: Phad Mutumba
- Production locations: Kampala, Uganda
- Production company: Phaz Motion Pictures

Original release
- Network: Pearl Magic
- Release: 2 January 2020

False Dreams is a Ugandan drama television series that premiered on DStv Uganda's Pearl Magic TV on 2 January 2020. The series stars Stellah Nantumbwe, Housen Mushema, Elizabeth Bwamimpeke and follows a group of friends from university who are struggling to navigate through the challenges in their lives. The series was produced by Phad Mutumba under the banner of his Phaz Motion Pictures in Kampala.

== Cast ==
- Housen Mushema as Duncan
- Joy Agaba as Janet
- Stella Nante as Lilian
- Derek Bakali as Mark Mangeni
- Alexon Audax as Jonathan
- Stellah Nantumbwe as Mellisa Nakito
- Elizabeth Bwamimpeke as Miriam
- Martha Kay

== Episodes ==
=== Series overview ===
Season	Episodes	Originally aired	
Season	Episodes	First aired	Last aired
1	11	2 January 2020	12 April 2020
2	11	17 April 2020	TBA
