= 94 Terror =

Ugandan war-drama film

- Directed by: Richard Mulindwa
- Written by: Richard Mulindwa
- Produced by: Richard Mulindwa
- Starring: Joan Agaba; Muyimbwa Phiona; Nalubega Rashida; Ninsiima Ronah; Shadi Smith; Mugerwa Rajj; Smith Mateega
- Cinematography: Rwamusigazi Kyakunzire
- Edited by: Richard Mulindwa
- Music by: Eli Arkhis
- Production company: LIMIT Production
- Release date: December 2018
- Running time: 106 minutes
- Countries: Uganda, Rwanda
- Languages: English; Kinyarwanda

94 Terror is a 2018 Ugandan war-drama film set in the Rwandan genocide of 1994. The film premiered on 14 December 2018 at a red carpet event at Theatre Labonita in Kampala and won Best Viewers' Choice Movie Award at the 2018 Uganda Film Festival Awards in the first week after the release.

== Plot ==
Keza narrowly escapes death during the 1994 Rwandan genocide in which the rest of her family perishes. She and her mates Shema, a Hutu and Mutesi, a Tutsi get on a run to sneak out of Rwanda to Uganda across the Kagera River border.

== Reception ==
94 Terror was very well received and immediately won Best Viewers' Choice Movie Award at the 2018 Uganda Film Festival Awards in the first week after the release. It went on to win the best Costume award at The African Film Festival (TAFF) in Dallas, Texas in 2019. It also led nominations at the 2019 Golden Movie Awards Africa (GMAA) in Ghana with 18 nominations including Best Movie Drama and Best Screenplay. The film received a double selection at both the Straight Jacket Guerrilla Festival in Mexico and the FICMEC Nador International Festival of Common Memory in France.

== Production ==
It was produced, written and directed by Richard Mulindwa and stars an all Ugandan cast of Ninsiima Ronah, Joan Agaba, Muyimbwa Phiona, Nalubega Rashida, Shadic Smith, Mugerwa Rajj, Smith Mateega. It was produced at LIMIT Production, a media production company ran by Richard Mulindwa himself. Filming for most of the film took place in Kasensero, Rakai District.

== Awards and nominations ==
Awards & Nominations
Year	Award	Category	Received by	Result	Ref
2019	ZAFAA Global Awards	Best Picture Editor	Mulindwa Rchard	Nominated	
2019	ZAFAA Global Awards	Best Screenplay	Mulindwa Rchard	Nominated	
2019	ZAFAA Global Awards	Best Lead Actor Female	Ninsiima Rhona	Nominated	
2019	ZAFAA Global Awards	Best Producer	Rhonnie Nkalubo Abraham	Nominated	
2019	ZAFAA Global Awards	Best Director	Rhonnie Nkalubo; Richard Mulindwa	Nominated	
2019	ZAFAA Global Awards	Best Cinematographer	Rwamutsigazi Kyakunzire	Nominated	
2019	ZAFAA Global Awards	Best Newcomer Female	Nalubega Rashidah	Nominated	
2019	Abuja International Film Festival	Outstanding feature film (Foreign)	Richard Mulindwa	Nominated	
2019	Abuja International Film Festival	Outstanding Film In Directing	Richard Mulindwa	Nominated	
2019	Abuja International Film Festival	Outstanding Actress	Ninsiima Ronah	Nominated	
2019	The African Film Festival (TAFF)	Best Costume	Nalubega Rashida	Won	
2019	Golden Movie Award Africa (GMAA)	Golden Costume	Nalubega Rashida	Won	
2019	Golden Movie Award Africa (GMAA)	Golden Actor in Drama	Smith Mateega	Nominated	
2019	Golden Movie Award Africa (GMAA)	Golden Screenplay Drama		Won	
2019	Golden Movie Award Africa (GMAA)	Golden Actress in Drama	Ninsiima Ronah	Nominated	
2019	Golden Movie Award Africa (GMAA)	Golden Most Promising Actor	Ninsiima Ronah	Nominated	
2019	Golden Movie Award Africa (GMAA)	Golden Discovery Actor	Ninsiima Ronah	Won	
2019	Golden Movie Award Africa (GMAA)	Golden Supporting Actress Drama	Agaba Joan	Nominated	
2019	Golden Movie Award Africa (GMAA)	Golden Supporting Actor Drama	Mugerwa Rajj	Nominated	
2019	Golden Movie Award Africa (GMAA)	Golden Cinematography	Rwamusigazi Kyakunzire	Nominated	
2019	Golden Movie Award Africa (GMAA)	Golden Makeup Artist		Won	
2019	Golden Movie Award Africa (GMAA)	Golden Soundtrack	Eli Arkhis	Nominated	
2019	Golden Movie Award Africa (GMAA)	Overall Golden Movie	Richard Mulindwa	Nominated	
2019	Golden Movie Award Africa (GMAA)	Golden Editor Video	Richard Mulindwa	Nominated	
2019	Golden Movie Award Africa (GMAA)	Golden Sound Editor	Richard Mulindwa	Nominated	
2019	Golden Movie Award Africa (GMAA)	Golden Art Director	Richard Mulindwa	Won	
2019	Golden Movie Award Africa (GMAA)	Golden Indigenous Movie	Richard Mulindwa	Nominated	
2019	Golden Movie Award Africa (GMAA)	Golden Movie Drama	Richard Mulindwa	Nominated	
2019	Golden Movie Award Africa (GMAA)	Golden Director	Richard Mulindwa	Won	
2018	Uganda Film Festival Awards (UFF) Awards	Best Viewers' Choice Movie Award	Richard Mulindwa	Won	
2018	Uganda Film Festival Awards (UFF) Awards	Best Cinematography		Nominated	
2018	Uganda Film Festival Awards (UFF) Awards	Best Sound		Nominated	
2018	Uganda Film Festival Awards (UFF) Awards	Best Script (Screenplay)		Nominated	
2018	Uganda Film Festival Awards (UFF) Awards	Best Feature Film		Nominated	
2018	Uganda Film Festival Awards (UFF) Awards	Best Director/Film of the Year	Richard Mulindwa	Nominated	
2018	Uganda Film Festival Awards (UFF) Awards	Best Supporting Actress	Joan Agaba	Nominated	

== External ==
- 94 Terror at IMDb
- Top 10 movies about the 1994 Genocide against the Tutsi
