= Kafa Coh =

Ugandan legal drama film

- Directed by: Gilbert Lukalia; Doreen Mirembe
- Written by: Musa Luswata; Doreen Mirembe; Adinjay Pormasu
- Produced by: Doreen Mirembe
- Starring: Kalu Ikeagwu; Doreen Mirembe; Michael Wawuyo; Mariam Ndagire; Abby Mukiibi Nkaaga; Rehema Nanfuka; Oyenbot
- Cinematography: Mustaque Abdallah
- Edited by: Alex Ireeta; Monica Mugo; Peter Mukiibi; Andrew Evens Odera
- Production company: Amani Film House
- Release date: 8 October 2022
- Country: Uganda
- Language: English

Kafa Coh is a Ugandan English language legal drama directed by Gilbert K. Lukalia, produced by Doreen Mirembe at her Amani House Productions in Kampala and stars Nigerian actor Kalu Ikeagwu, Doreen Mirembe, singer, producer and actor Mariam Ndagire, Abby Mukiibi Nkaaga, Rehema Nanfuka, Vladimir Stefanov and Oyenbot. It premiered in Kampala on October 8, 2022 and showed in cinema up to October 13 of the same year.

== Plot ==
The film is set in a fictional African country of Tangosi, where a young lawyer, Sandrah Atika Alexis finds herself in the middle of bloody conflict between two political heavyweights. She faces barriers in her fight for justice in a very corrupt political scene in the country of Tangosi.

== Casting and Production ==
The film cast mostly Uganda's most popular actors, with a guest lead actor Kalu Ikeagwu from Nigerian and Vladimir Stefanov. Production for the film started in 2018 under Doreen Mirembe's own production company, Amani House Productions. The film had been set for release in 2020 but the COVID-19 Pandemic and associated lockdowns caused a postponement. In February 2022, it was announced that it would be released on October 10, 2022 in Kampala.

=== Cast & Characters ===
- Kalu Ikeagwu as David IBN Arima
- Doreen Mirembe as Sandra Atika Alexis
- Michael Wawuyo as Cedric Nkono
- Mariam Ndagire as Asha Nkono
- Abby Mukiibi Nkaaga as Golomadi
- Rehema Nanfuka as Lisa Borera
- Vladimir Stefanov as Paul
- Oyenbot as Kisaka
- Patriq Nkakalukanyi as Koroma Nkono
- Charles Mulekwa as Justice Boscosi
- Peter Odeke as Tereke Stephens
- Laura Atwine as Dr. Ismailah
- Michael Wawuyo Jr. as Mule
- Philip Luswata as Joshua
- Diana Kahunde as Dr. Sabrina
- River Dan Rugaju as Uzobia
- Albert Bagabe as Dr. Brian
- Stella Nante as Joanna
