= The Silent Army =

- Original film poster
- Wit Licht
- Directed by: Jean van de Velde
- Written by: Jean van de Velde (screenplay); Sandra Nagtzaam (plotline)
- Produced by: Paul Brinks; Chris Brouwer; Richard Claus
- Starring: Marco Borsato; Thekla Reuten; Abby Mukiibi Nkaaga; Andrew Kintu; Siebe Schoneveld
- Cinematography: Theo van de Sande
- Music by: Nick Laird-Clowes
- Distributed by: Independent Films
- Release date: 11 December 2008
- Running time: 120 minutes
- Country: Netherlands
- Languages: English; Swahili; Dutch
- Budget: €7 million

The Silent Army is a recut, international version of the 2008 Dutch drama film Wit Licht (Dutch: Wit Licht meaning White Light) directed by Jean van de Velde about the hardships of child soldiers in Africa. It marks the acting debut of singer Marco Borsato. On December 29, 2008, it was reported that, despite bad reviews, the film had received a gold certification. More than 100,000 people went to see the film in two weeks time. In April 2009, it was announced that the film would be shown at the 2009 Cannes Film Festival.

== Plot ==
Eduard Zuiderwijk (Marco Borsato) runs a restaurant in Africa. When his wife (Ricky Koole) suddenly dies, he is left to take care of his son Thomas (Siebe Schoneveld) on his own. When his son's best friend Abu (Andrew Kintu) is abducted by a rebel leader to be trained as a child soldier, Eduard goes in pursuit to save the boy and regain his son's respect.

== Cast ==
Cast
Actor	Character
Marco Borsato	Eduard Zuiderwijk
Thekla Reuten	Valerie
Ricky Koole	Anna Zuiderwijk
Peter van den Begin	Francois
Andrew Kintu	Abu
Abby Mukiibi Nkaaga	Obeke
Adrian Galley	Ruud van Kalenberg
Sam Okelo	Abu's Dad
Siebe Schoneveld	Thomas Zuiderwijk
Frederick Mpuuga	commander

== Production ==
The idea for the film originated with singer Marco Borsato, who is an ambassador for the non-profit organisation War Child Holland. After hearing stories from former child soldiers who had been through War Child Holland's programmes, Borsato became interested in initiating a film inspired by these stories. Together with his manager Paul Brinks, he decided that making a movie would be good for his career. Unfortunately, he found none of the scripts he was sent suitable because he couldn't connect to them. Eventually, a friend, Sandra Nagtzaam (Borsato's first manager) wrote a fitting story. A lot of elements in the screenplay are based on true events. Borsato has been an ambassador for War Child Holland for almost ten years and child soldiers was a subject he was often confronted with and something that he connected with. Paul and Marco asked Dutch film producer Chris Brouwer to produce the film. He brought the story to writer/director Jean van de Velde. Van de Velde wrote the screenplay and asked Borsato to take on the lead role.

The film was recorded on location; first in Uganda, then in South Africa.

After the movie had a big release in the Netherlands, French critic and movie director Pierre Rissient saw it and thought Wit Licht could do well internationally if it were recut drastically. Rissient cut out many Dutch scenes, took away the music, changed the ending and made the movie more suitable for arthouse audiences. This resulted in an invitation for the Un Certain Regard program at the Cannes Festival.

A majority of the film was shot in Port Saint Johns on the east of the Wild Coast. Its natural beauty and the abandoned airport on the top of a local mountain were the main reasons this location was chosen. During the shoot over 1400 locals were enlisted as extras to aid the 150 cast and crew. Early on during shooting in South Africa, a house which was used as a sleeping place by crew was attacked. Since then, extra security has been on the set.

Shooting was also done in Uganda in an area where a war just ended and a peace treaty wasn't yet signed. Hundreds of people who experienced this war were extras. Borsato said: "The tension on their faces is real. We also filmed in refugee camps. That gives the film authenticity. It is suspenseful and touching, a real story."

== Related works ==
Borsato also released a single and an album and he performed in a series of concerts in Gelredome, all carrying the same name as the movie. Although they carry the same name, the single and album are not a soundtrack to the film. The music is inspired by the emotions and themes of the movie instead.

== See also ==
- 24: Redemption, film with a similar theme.
- Johnny Mad Dog, film with a similar theme.
- Heart of Fire, a film directed by Luigi Falorni, also has a similar theme.
