= Richard Tuwangye =

Ugandan actor, comedian, and musician (born 1980)

- Born: 16 October 1980 (age 46); Masaka, Uganda
- Education: Makerere University (BA Drama)
- Occupations: Entertainer, actor, comedian, MC
- Years active: 2004–present
- Known for: Entertainment-comedy at Fun Factory Uganda and Master of Ceremonies
- Spouse: Sharon Atwiine Kagarura (m. 2016)
- Children: 2

Richard Tuwangye (born 16 October 1980) is a Ugandan actor, comedian, and musician. He is a founding member of Fun Factory Uganda.

== Early life ==
Tuwangye was born 16 October 1980 to Enock Tuwangye and Hope Tuwangye in Masaka, Uganda. In 1987, he began his primary education at Molly and Paul Primary School, where he started acting in a school drama in Primary One. In Primary Five, he transferred to Bwara Primary School and completed his Primary Leaving Examinations in 1993. He then attended St. Henry's College Kitovu, where he completed the Uganda Certificate of Education in 1997. He continued his studies at Kako Senior Secondary School, where he earned his Uganda Advanced Certificate of Education. He was later admitted to Makerere University’s School of Performing Arts, graduating with a Bachelor of Arts in Drama in 2004.

== Career ==
=== Acting ===
In 2002, Tuwangye acted in several plays at the National Theatre, including The Virgin, The Journeys, and A Jewel in Every Name. He joined Theatre Factory in October 2003 and later appeared in Hand in Hand as Daudi and The Last King of Scotland as a politician's assistant. Tuwangye also joined Rock Point Radio, where he portrayed Deo and won a Voice Actor's Award before leaving in 2007. He acted in the short film What Happened in Room 13 and co-founded Fun Factory Uganda in January 2010, serving as Communications Director and performing in Comedicine.

Tuwangye appeared in Speak Out, which premiered on 21 January 2010, and joined The Hostel in 2011 as Twine, leaving in the following year after fee disputes. He was also part of Silent Voices, The Play in 2012. In 2016, Tuwangye appeared as Dez in Queen of Katwe and as Dj Kadanke in Rain. In June 2018, he was among nine actors signed by the Development Channel to promote the African Child Poverty Alleviator Program.

=== Music ===
In 2004, Tuwangye formed the VIP Modern Dance Troupe. In 2005, he wrote and recorded the song "Can't Live Without You," produced by Fenon Records. The VIP Modern Dance Troupe later evolved into a music group and released "Tugendeyo." Following their third release, the group disbanded. In 2015, Tuwangye released a single titled "What Should I Do?".

=== Stand-up ===
In 2013, Richard performed as part of the acts celebrating Pablo's nine years in the comedy industry. On 12 July 2019, he hosted his first solo comedy show, titled "Laugh Conquers All."

=== Host ===
In March 2009, Tuwangye co-hosted the launch of NewFem contraceptive by the Uganda Health Marketing Group (UHMG) alongside Gloria Kasujja. In May 2010, he emceed the Buzz Teeniez Awards ceremony. In May 2018, he hosted Live Sipping Night at Racer's Bar, Bukoto, and in October 2018, he emceed Kenneth Mugabi's maiden concert, "Strings of My Soul."

== Personal life ==
Tuwangye is the second of five siblings, born to Enock and Hope Tuwangye. He married Sharon Atwiine Kagarura on 3 June 2016. The couple has two children.

== Filmography ==
=== Film ===
| Year | Title | Role | Citations |
|---|---|---|---|
| 2006 | The Last King of Scotland | | |
| 2006 | They Stopped Eating Fruits | Sebiku | |
| 2008 | Speak Out | Boda boda man mobilizing people to stand against corruption. | |
| 2007 | What Happened in Room 13 | Peter | |
| 2016 | Queen of Katwe | Dez | |
| | Silent Voices | Husband to a troubled wife | |
| 2017 | Rain | Dj Kadanke | |

=== Television ===
| Year | Title | Role | Notes | TV Network |
|---|---|---|---|---|
| 2005 | Hand in Hand | Daudi | An unemployed hustler full of mischief | |
| 2011 | The Hostel | Twine | | |
| 2010 - 2015 | U-turn | Various roles | | NTV |
| 2015 - 2017 | U-turn | Various roles | | NBS |
| 2018–present | Mizigo Express | Clinton | A Nigerian tenant who turns out to be a conman | DStv (Pearl Magic) |

== Theatre ==
| Year | Title | Role | Citation |
|---|---|---|---|
| 2002 | The Virgin | Bogolio, a houseboy | |
| 2002 | The Journeys | | |
| 2002 | A Jewel in Every Name | An orphaned son of a woman killed by the war in Northern Uganda | |
| 2003 | The Adams | | |
| 2006 | The Nasty Good Stories | | |
