= The Only Son (2016 film) =

- Directed by: Richard Mulindwa
- Screenplay by: Richard Mulindwa
- Produced by: Bobby Tamale; Richard Mulindwa
- Starring: Bobby Tamale; Michael Wawuyo Sr.; Raymond Rushabiro; Nisha Kalema
- Cinematography: Rwamusigazi Kyankunzire
- Music by: Eli Arkhis
- Production companies: Tamz Production; Limit Production
- Release date: 22 July 2016 (Kampala Serena Hotel)
- Country: Uganda
- Languages: Luganda; English

The Only Son is a Ugandan film written and directed by Richard Mulindwa starring Bobby Tamale, Michael Wawuyo Snr., Raymond Rushabiro, and Nisha Kalema. The film was released on 22 July 2016 at the Kampala Serena Hotel. The film was nominated in six categories at the 2016 Uganda Film Festival including Best Screenplay, Best Sound, Best Editing, Film of the Year, Best lead Actor and Best Feature Film.

== Plot ==
Davis (Bobby Tamale) faces the biggest challenges of his life when his father (Michael Wawuyo) is diagnosed with cancer. While his father (Michael Wawuyo) is worried about the future of his legacy, all his goods and businesses allegedly get to be frozen due to embezzlement issues. The lavish and careless Davis has to man up and start over again, but will he manage his new life on the street even after losing his friends, girlfriend and can't live in the village as ordered by his father.

Struggling with village life, Davis heads back to town—setting off a high-stakes journey filled with life-altering challenges and unexpected allies who change his world forever.

== Cast ==
- Bobby Tamale as Davis
- Michael Wawuyo Sr. as Father
- Raymond Rushabiro as Uncle
- Nisha Kalema as Diana
- Felix Bwanika Baale
- Mutebi Farooq
- Dushime Gemin
- Wilberforce Muteta
- Ssebandeke Phionah
- Doreen Nabbanja as Sylvia

== Awards ==
=== Nominated ===
- 2016: Best Screenplay, Best Sound, Best Editing, Film of the Year/Best Director, Best lead Actor and Best Feature Film - Uganda Film Festival Awards
