= Freedom (2016 film) =

Ugandan film

- Directed by: Richard Mulindwa
- Written by: Richard Mulindwa
- Screenplay by: Nisha Kalema, Richard Mulindwa
- Produced by: Richard Mulindwa
- Starring: Nisha Kalema; Raymond Rushabiro
- Production company: LIMIT Production
- Release date: 2016
- Country: Uganda
- Language: English

Freedom is a 2016 Ugandan drama film set in the pre-NRA war times and details the despicable abuse suffered by an unlucky Amelia (Nisha Kalema) at the hands of her adoptive father. The film was produced by Richard Mulindwa and screenplay by both Mulindwa and Nisha Kalema. After its release, the film dominated nominations and awards at the 2016 Uganda Film Festival Awards with nine nominations and six wins including Best Feature Film, Best Director, Best Actor (film) and Best Actress (film).

== In Theatre ==
British producer and religious minister George Hargreaves premiered Freedom on stage in Europe in August 2017. It was staged at the Edinburgh Fringe Festival in Scotland and the Bernie Grant Arts Centre in London between August 15-26th that same year.

== Controversy on Screenplay ==
Nisha Kalema who was the film's screenwriter lost her screen writing credits on the promotional posters, film’s DVD and theatre release, hence falling out with the producers of the film. She was however credited on IMDb for screenplay.

== Awards and nominations ==
Awards & Nominations
Year	Award	Category	Received by	Result
2016	Uganda Film Festival Awards (UFF)	Best Costume/Design Award		Won
2016	Uganda Film Festival Awards (UFF)	Best Cinematography		Won
2016	Uganda Film Festival Awards (UFF)	Film of the year/Best Director		Won
2016	Uganda Film Festival Awards (UFF)	Best Actress (Film)	Nisha Kalema	Won
2016	Uganda Film Festival Awards (UFF)	Best Feature Film	Richard Mulindwa	Won
2016	Uganda Film Festival Awards (UFF)	Best Editing/Post Production		Won
2016	Uganda Film Festival Awards (UFF)	Best Screenplay		Nominated
2016	Uganda Film Festival Awards (UFF)	Best Actor (Film)	Raymond Rushabiro	Nominated
2016	Uganda Film Festival Awards (UFF)	Best Sound		Nominated

== External ==
- Freedom at IMDb
