= Bella (2017 film) =

2017 Ugandan film

Bella (film)
- Directed by: Matt Bish
- Starring: Cinderella Sanyu; Abby Mukiibi Nkaaga; Roger Mugisha; Matthew Nabwiso; Stellah Nantumbwe; Simon Base Kalema; Michael Wawuyo Jr.; Joel Okuyo Atiku
- Release dates: October 2017 (Victoria Hall, Kampala Serena Hotel); 22 October 2018
- Country: Uganda
- Language: English

Bella is a Ugandan drama film directed by Matt Bish and stars Cinderella Sanyu in her debut film acting role as Bella. It also stars Abby Mukiibi Nkaaga, Matthew Nabwiso, Simon Base Kalema, Roger Mugisha, Stellah Nantumbwe, Joel Okuyo Atiku, Michael Wawuyo Jr. The film premiered at Victoria Hall, Kampala Serena Hotel in October 2017.

== Summary ==
Bella tells the story of a homeless girl with a great singing talent who one day crosses paths with a music promoter and her life changes for the better. Bella is played by newcomer actress Cinderella Sanyu, an experienced singer who has been singing since the early 2000s.

== Reception ==
The film received numerous nominations at the Uganda Film Festival Awards in 2018 including Best Feature Film, Best Actress, Best Screenplay and Best Cinematography among others. The however won only one award, Best Supporting Actress award received by Stellah Nantumbwe. Cindy also received a nomination at the Africa Movie Academy Awards in Nigeria for Best Young Actor and at the Nigeria Entertainment Awards for Best Africa Lead Actor (Non Nigerian), both for her role as Bella. The film also received two nominations at the 6th Africa Magic Viewers Choice Awards

== Awards and nominations ==
Awards & Nominations
Year	Award	Category	Received by	Result
2018	Uganda Film Festival Awards	Best Script (Screenplay)		Nominated
2018	Uganda Film Festival Awards	Best Actress	Cindy Sanyu	Nominated
2018	Uganda Film Festival Awards	Best Supporting Actress in a Feature Film	Stellah Nantumbwe	Won
2018	Uganda Film Festival Awards	Best Sound		Nominated
2018	Uganda Film Festival Awards	Best Cinematography		Nominated
2018	Uganda Film Festival Awards	Best Costume (Production Design)		Nominated
2018	Uganda Film Festival Awards	Best Feature Film		Nominated
2018	Uganda Film Festival Awards	Best Post Production/Editing		Nominated
2018	Africa Magic Viewers Choice Awards	Best Soundtrack	Andrew Ahuura	Nominated
2018	Africa Magic Viewers Choice Awards	Best Movie East Africa	Matt Bish	Nominated
2018	Africa Movie Academy Awards	Best Young Actor	Cinderella Sanyu	Nominated
2018	Nigeria Entertainment Awards	Best Africa Actor (Non-Nigerian)	Cinderella Sanyu	Nominated
