= Morris Mugisha =

Ugandan model, actor

Morris Herbert Mugisha
- Born: 23 November; Kigezi, Uganda
- Citizenship: Uganda
- Education: Makerere University
- Occupations: Actor, Director, Producer, Model
- Years active: 2013–present
- Known for: Big Brother Africa 2013
- Children: 2
- Modeling information
- Height: 5 ft 7 in (170 cm)
- Hair color: Black
- Eye color: Brown

Morris Herbert Mugisha, known as Morris Mugisha, is a Ugandan actor, director, photographer, model, and reality television personality. He represented Uganda in the third season of Big Brother Africa in 2008 and directed the feature film Stain, which received twelve nominations at the Uganda Film Festival Awards, winning five, and secured an award at the 2021 Africa Movie Academy Awards.

== Early life ==
Born in Kigezi, Mugisha graduated from Makerere University with a degree in arts (literature, communication, and film), a diploma in performing arts (music, dance, and drama), and a diploma in radio and TV production.

== Career ==
Before appearing on Big Brother Africa in 2008, where he placed sixth, Mugisha worked as a model and photographer. After the show, he founded MOIDEAS, a production company where he serves as art director, producer, and copywriter. His first production, the 2019 short film Fear Knows My Name, marked his entry into filmmaking. In 2021, his directorial debut Stain earned twelve nominations at the Uganda Film Festival Awards, winning five, including Best Feature Film. The film also garnered six nominations at the Africa Movie Academy Awards in Nigeria, with Mugisha nominated for Best Director and the film winning Best Actress in a Leading Role. Mugisha began acting in radio and television commercials before landing his first onscreen role as Kevin in Mistakes Girls Do. He later appeared in Kyaddala (2019), Black Glove, and Sanyu (2021).

== Filmography ==
Film
Year	Title	Role	Notes
2008	Big Brother Africa	Morris	Reality TV
2017	Mistakes Girls Do	Kevin	Television series
2019	Fear Knows My Name		Short film (as a director, producer & writer)
2019	Kyaddala	Rugby Coach	Television series
2020	Stain		Feature film (as director and producer)
2021	Black Glove	Brook	Feature film (as an actor)
2022	Tembele		Feature film (as director and producer)

== Awards and nominations ==
Year	Nominated work	Association	Category	Result	Ref.
2022	Tembele	Uganda Film Festival Awards	Best Feature Film	Won	
2021	Stain	Uganda Film Festival Awards	Best Feature Film	Won	
2021	Stain	Uganda Film Festival Awards	Viewers' Choice Award	Nominated	
2021	Stain	Uganda Film Festival Awards	Best Indigenous Film	Nominated	
2021	Stain	Uganda Film Festival Awards	Best Screenplay	Nominated	
2021	Stain	Uganda Film Festival Awards	Best Director	Nominated	
2021	Stain	Africa Movie Academy Awards	Best Film	Nominated	
2021	Stain	Africa Movie Academy Awards	Best film in an African Language	Nominated	
2021	Stain	Africa Movie Academy Awards	Best Director	Nominated	
2021	Stain	Africa Movie Academy Awards	Best Script (Screen Play)	Nominated	
