= Michael Wawuyo =

Ugandan actor (born 1948)

Michael Wawuyo Sr
- Born: 11 November 1948 (age 76)
- Citizenship: Ugandan
- Occupations: Actor; Special effects artist
- Years active: 1991 – present
- Children: Michael Wawuyo Jr. (Son)

Michael Wawuyo Sr is a Ugandan actor and special effects artist. He is notable for his big screen roles on Last King of Scotland, Kony: Order from Above, The Only Son, Sometimes in April, The Mercy of the Jungle, The Taste of our Land, and small screen roles on Uganda NTV's Yat Madit and Power of Legacy.

== Career ==
Wawuyo broke into film industry in the 1991 Mira Nair directed film Mississippi Masala playing a terrorist soldier. He subsequently took on a series of military-type roles in several international productions, including an intelligence security officer in Black Blood (1997); a military commander in the HBO film Sometimes in April (2005) about the Rwandan genocide; and an air force commander in The Last King of Scotland (2016) about former Ugandan president Idi Amin.

In addition to homegrown Ugandan productions, Wawuyu continues to periodically work in regional African and international films, including the awarding winning Rwandan films The Mercy of the Jungle (2018) and A Taste of our Land (2022). The latter film, set in an unnamed African country and told against the backdrop of Chinese influence on the continent, garnered him the Best Male Actor award at Morocco's Festival du Cinéma Africain de Khouribga.

His Ugandan films include Situka (2015); Kony: Order from Above (2017), The Boda Boda Thieves (Abaabi Ba Booda) (2015), The Only Son (2016) and The Girl in the Yellow Jumper (2020), the first Ugandan film to be made available on Netflix.

After a quarter of a century of big screen appearances, Wawuyo made his television debut on NTV Uganda's 2016 award-winning drama series,Yat Madit, about a fictional post-conflict Northern Ugandan community. The series was part of an effort to promote reconciliation and peace among post-conflict communities in North and North Eastern Uganda following Joseph Kony's Lord's Resistance Army war. Wawuyo's next television role was in the 2019 television drama series Power of Legacy, starring as the patriarch of the Batte family hotel empire.

Wawuyo is also known for his work as a special effects and make up artist on films that includeThe Felista's Fable (2013) for which he received his first nomination at the 2nd Africa Magic Viewers' Choice Awards in 2014, Imbabazi: The Pardon (2013), and The Mercy of the Jungle (2018).

At the Uganda 2024 iKon Awards, Wawuyo was given a Lifetime Achievement Award.

== Filmography ==
Year	Title	Role	Notes
2022	Taste of Our Land	Yohani	
2022	Kafa Coh	Cedric Nkono	
2020	The Girl in the Yellow Jumper		
2019	Power of Legacy	Zacharias Batte Sr.	
2018	The Mercy of the Jungle	Village Chief	Rwandan film by Joël Karekezi
2017	Kony: Order from Above		About the LRA Rebel leader Joseph Kony
2016	Yat Madit	Achan	Aired on NTV Uganda in 2016-2017
2016	The Only Son	Father	
2015	King of Darkness	James - Airport store man	
2015	Situka	Muwadada	
2015	The Boda Boda Thieves	Goodman	
2014	Bullion		Produced by Henry H. Ssali and directed by Phillip Luswata
2013	Luzira:Escape From Uganda	Inspector Michael Morais	Malayalam thriller movie directed by Rajesh Nair
2013	Imbabazi: The Pardon	Kalisa	Rwandan film by Joël Karekezi
2013	The Felistas Fable	Kuku	
2012	Bye Bye Mzungu	Waswa	Short
2006	The Last King of Scotland	Air Force Commander	Hollywood Production starring Forest Whitaker as Idi Amin, Kerry Washington as Kay Amin and James McAvoy as Dr. Nicholas Garrigan
2005	Sometimes in April	RAF Soldier #8	HBO TV Movie about Rwandan genocide of 1994
1991	Mississippi Masala	Soldier on Bus	Mira Nair directed film

== Awards and nominations ==
Year	Nominated work	Association	Category	Result	Notes
2024		iKon Awards	Lifetime Achievement Award	Won	
2022	Taste of our Land	Festival du Cinéma Africain de Khouribga	Best Male Actor	Won	
2017		Uganda Film Festival Awards	Judges' Choice Award	Won	Honorary Award
2014	Felista's Fable	Africa Magic Viewers' Choice Awards (AMVCAs)	Make Up Artiste of the Year	Nominated	
