= Uganda Film Festival Award for Best Cinematography =

Category of film award

- Awarded for: Excellence in Cinematography Achievement
- Country: Uganda
- Presented by: Uganda Communications Commission (UCC)
- First award: 2013

The Uganda Film Festival Award for Best Cinematography is an award presented annually by Uganda Communications Commission (UCC) at the Uganda Film Festival Awards.

== Nominees and winners ==
The table shows the winners and nominees for the Best Cinematography award.

Table key
indicates the winner

| Year | Film | Ref. |
|---|---|---|
| 2013 (1st) | Where We Belong | |
| 2013 (1st) | Die with me | |
| 2013 (1st) | The King’s Virgin | |
| 2013 (1st) | The Trespass | |
| 2013 (1st) | The Curse | |
| 2014 (2nd) | Zamora | |
| 2014 (2nd) | The Superstition | |
| 2014 (2nd) | Reform | |
| 2015 (3rd) | Boda Boda Thieves (Abaabi Ba Boda) | |
| 2015 (3rd) | The Tailor | |
| 2015 (3rd) | House Arrest | |
| 2015 (3rd) | Hanged for Love | |
| 2016 (4th) | Freedom | |
| 2016 (4th) | Evidence | |
| 2016 (4th) | Wako | |
| 2016 (4th) | New Intentions | |
| 2016 (4th) | Dream America | |
| 2017 (5th) | Devil’s Chest | |
| 2017 (5th) | Kony: Order from Above | |
| 2017 (5th) | Dawn of Oppression | |
| 2017 (5th) | Breaking with Customs | |
| 2017 (5th) | The Torture | |
| 2018 (6th) | Veronica's Wish | |
| 2018 (6th) | Bella | |
| 2018 (6th) | 94 Terror | |
| 2018 (6th) | The Forbidden | |
| 2018 (6th) | Slay Queens | |
| 2019 (7th) | August | |
| 2019 (7th) | Country of Men | |
| 2019 (7th) | N.S.I.W.E | |
| 2019 (7th) | Lailah | |
