= Hakkunde =

- Directed by: Asurf Oluseyi
- Starring: Frank Donga; Rahama Sadau; Maryam Booth
- Cinematography: Funmi Daramola
- Music by: Moelogo Ceeza Clasiq
- Production company: Asurf Films
- Release date: 2017
- Running time: 92 minutes
- Country: Nigeria
- Languages: English; Hausa; Yoruba

Hakkunde is a 2017 Nigerian movie directed by Oluseyi Asurf. The film won the Africa Movie Academy Award for Best Screenplay in 2018 and received nominations for Best Actor in a Leading Role and Best Actress in a Supporting Role.

== Plot ==
A young man who graduated from the university is battling with self-identity and how he tries to surpass it and make a difference in his community and society. He faced with life's pressures decides to relocate to Kaduna from Lagos when an opportunity presents itself against his sister's wishes. His expectations is however cut short and Akande must make a decision to either learn to survive or return to failure.

== Cast ==
- Frank Donga as Akande
- Toyin Aimakhu as Yewande
- Rahama Sadau as Aisha
- Maryam Booth as Binta
- Bukky Ajayi as Akande's mother
- Ibrahim Daddy as Ibrahim, Okada man
- Isa Bello as Alhaji Sule
- Hadiza Solja as Amina
- Ali Nuhu as Dr. Waziri
- Shade Ladipo as Nike
- Mustapha Saidu as Alhaji Goma
- Tomiwa Kukoyi as Aboki
- Seyilaw as Janto Boveh
