= Kony: Order from Above =

2017 film

- Film poster
- Directed by: Steve T. Ayeny
- Written by: Sandra Kosse; Steve T. Ayeny
- Produced by: Steve T. Ayeny
- Starring: Joel Okuyo Prynce; Michael Wawuyo; Steve T. Ayeny
- Cinematography: Alex Ireeta
- Edited by: Misanvu Mike; Loïc Niyonkoru
- Music by: Andrew Ahuurra; Isaiah Mucunguzi
- Release date: 2 December 2017 (Zanzibar IFF)
- Running time: 90 minutes
- Country: Uganda
- Languages: Acholi, Kiswahili

Kony: Order from Above is a 2017 Ugandan war film directed by Steve T. Ayeny. It was initially reported as being the Ugandan entry for the Best International Feature Film at the 92nd Academy Awards. However, it was later confirmed as not being selected as it could not meet the mandatory minimum requirements. It would have been Uganda's first-ever submission to the Oscars. It also received a nomination for Best Feature Film and Cinematography at the 2017 Uganda Film Festival Awards

== Plot ==
Amidst the insurgency of the Lord's Resistance Army, two young lovers are separated.

== Cast ==
- Joel Okuyo Prynce as Kony
- Steve T. Ayeny as Agutti
- Michael Wawuyo as Amziwa
- T. Steve Ayeny as Otti
- Papo Can as Lapwony
- Brenda Apoko as Lapwony's Wife
- Otim Rayvon as Arab Prince
- Amongi Collin as Dorothy's Mother
- Epukka Joel as Dorothy's Father
- Agetta Francis as Short Sleeves
- Patrick Ocang as Young Daniel
- Ojede Cokson as Witch Doctor
- Denis Ongona as Ochwo

== See also ==
- List of submissions to the 92nd Academy Awards for Best International Feature Film
