= Abby Mukiibi Nkaaga =

Ugandan actor

- Born: Jinja Uganda
- Citizenship: Ugandan
- Education: Makerere University,
- Occupations: Theatre Director; Producer; Actor; Radio personality
- Years active: 1994–present
- Children: 4

Abby Mukiibi Nkaaga is a Ugandan actor, comedian, director producer, and radio personality, recognised for theatre plays, film, television and radio. He is the founder of Afri Talent, a Ugandan drama group and veteran radio presenter at 88.8 CBS in Kampala. He has played mostly military roles in films such as The Last King of Scotland (Masanga), Sometimes in April (Colonel Bagosora), The Silent Army (Michel Obeke) and The Mercy of the Jungle (Major). He was listed #1 on the list of the ten best Ugandan com..edians by Big Eye in 2015.

== Career. ==
=== Theatre ===
Nkaaga started out as a supporting cast member at his uncle Omugave Ndugwa's theatrical drama group The Black Pearls in 1988. He worked on several productions but started getting recognition when he played a lead role on Ziribasanga Ne Sanyu. At the time such roles were reserved for Fred Kalule, Ndugwa, and Omulangira Kayondo, the big stars of the time. When Kato Lubwama and some of his friends left The Black Pearls in 1993, Nkaaga also started Afri Talent with his other colleagues Ruth Wanyana, Brenda Nanyonjo, Michael Mabira, Bob Bulime and John Segawa. His breakout role in Afri Talent was when he acted as Chombe, a ruthless leader who didn’t care about the plight of soldiers' families. His performance attracted UPDF army commander Gen Mugisha Muntu who praised Mukiibi for the performance. He received an award for Best Actor at the Uganda National Theater Awards in 1994 when he played Kabaka Muteesa II in Saagala Agalamidde. His other works in theatre include Ekitangaala Munzikiza, Omuyaga Mu Makoola, Omusaayi Gw’obutiko, Olujegere Lw’obulamu, Galimpitawa with The Black Pearls and Order, The Best of Abby and Patricko, Ensitaano, Safari, Sebalamu, Tebesigwa, Mbyaase and Akandolindoli at Afri Talent.

=== Film ===
Mukiibi started appearing in films in 1996 starting with Fire of Hope. In 2005, he played a lead villain role as Colonel Théoneste Bagosora in the HBO film Sometimes in April, about the Rwandan genocide of 1994. His performance in Sometimes in April gave him recognition in the East African region and he started getting more international roles, including a Hollywood role in The Last King of Scotland in 2006 and a role in a South African film The Silent Army in 2008 about the LRA war in northern Uganda. He played a role of a Major in another Rwandan genocide film The Mercy of the Jungle in 2018. His other film roles include John in Imperial Blue (2019) and the Golomadi in the upcoming legal drama film Kafa Coh.

=== Radio ===
Abby Mukiibi was scouted by Daudi Ochieng and Peter Sematima to join radio in 1996 when they opened CBS radio. He started presenting the morning sports show Kalisoliso Wemizanyo and has presented it since then, remaining one of the longest serving radio personality in a show and at a radio station in Uganda. He later got promoted to the stations' programmes director.

== Personal life ==
Nkaaga was born in Jinja to the late Erias Simwogerere and the late Madina Simwogerere. He grew up in the Jinja Walukuba housing estates. He studied Music, Dance and Drama (MDD) at Makerere University. He is married to Stella Namatovu, and they have four children.

== Filmography ==
Year	Movie/Film	Role	Notes
1994	Fires of Hope		
1996	Ultimatum		
1998	Frontiers of Hell		
2000-2004	Ensitano (The Scuffle)		Television Soap by Afri-Talent on WBS TV.
2002	Omo Pick A Box	(Himself - Host)	TV show
2005	Sometimes in April	Colonel Bagosora	HBO Television film directed by Raul Peck
2006	The Last King of Scotland	Masanga	Hollywood film directed by Kevin Macdonald
2007	The Good Life	(Himself - Host)	TV Health Show
2008	Strength of a Stranger		Directed by Mariam Ndagire
2008	White Light/The Silent Army	Michel Obeke	South African film
2008	Stand Up Uganda	(Himself - Judge)	MNET Africa TV Comedy show
2009	Hearts in Pieces		Directed by Mariam Ndagire
2017	Bella		A Matt Bish directed film
2018	The Mercy of the Jungle	Major	A Rwandan genocide film directed by Joel Karekezi
2019	Imperial Blue	John	Directed by Dan Moss
2020	Kafa Coh	Golomadi	An Amani Film House film.
2021	Sanyu		TV series on Pearl Magic Prime.
2023	Case Closed		Short
