= The Hostel =

Ugandan television drama series

- Poster
- Genre: Drama
- Created by: Sabiiti "MMC" Moses and Emanuel "BUUBA" Egwel
- Written by: Various: Sabiiti Moses; Emanuel Egwel; Kwezi Kaganda; Consodyne Buzabo; Cathy Bagaya; Frunc AM Bisase; Edris Matu Segawa; Daphne Ampire; Matthew Chan-Piu; Pheona Nakishero; Elma Asio; Bentzen Kyaze; Brian Githehu; Lloyd Lutara
- Directed by: Various: SEASON 1 Joanitta Bewulira-Wandera (ep.1-9, 11-14), Kwezi Kaganda (Ep.10,15 -90); SEASON 2 -Kwezi Kaganda, Dilman Dila and Davidson Mugume; SEASON 3 - Davidson Mugume; SEASON 4 - Kennedy Kihire
- Starring: Kuddzu Isaac; Hellen Lukoma; Daniel Omara; Richard Tuwangye; Michael Wawuyo Jr.; Taryn Kyaze as TESSA; Housen Mushema; Bettinah Tianah; Akite Agnes
- Theme music composer: Sabiiti "MMC" Moses, Rita Sabiiti and EVON
- Composers: Sabiiti "MMC" Moses and Rita Sabiiti
- Country of origin: Uganda
- Original language: English
- No. of seasons: 4

Production
- Production locations: Kampala, Uganda
- Camera setup: Single-camera
- Running time: 43 minutes
- Production company: Fastrack Productions Ltd

Original release
- Network: NTV Uganda
- Release: February 5, 2011 – 2015

The Hostel is a Ugandan drama series created by Sabiiti "MMC" Moses and Emanuel "BUUBA" Egwel about the lives of university students in their hostels. The show premiered on NTV Uganda in 2011 and ran for four seasons. The fourth season, which was titled "Serenity", saw a fresh new cast in a new hostel. The season premiered on 23 February 2015.

The series aired on NTV Uganda, DSTV - Africa Magic Entertainment, ZUKU TV and NTV KENYA, Canal France International and their African Partners, eTV, Star Times and Rwanda TV.

The series started airing in the UK on 4 February 2013 on Channel 182 Ben TV for the European continent audience.

== Overview ==
The Hostel is a comedy-drama about the endless hopes, fears, struggle, frustrations, pressures and challenges that affect students at higher institutions of learning, especially those who reside in hostels. It features the adaptation to city life, roommates, friendships, hassles, prostitution, romantic liaisons, jealousy, sexual pursuits, hatred, broken hearts, lovers’ joys, academic pressures, college & hostel fee challenges, part-time jobs, independence, ethnic and religious diversity, parental control, career, cross-generational sex, hopes and nightmares, AIDS, condoms, alcohol, cigarettes, drugs, parties, and loneliness.

== Reception ==
The show generally received positive reviews and garnered a following in Uganda and beyond.

== Production ==
The Hostel was a collaboration between Sabiiti "MMC" Moses, Emanuel "BUUBA" Egwel and Fast Track Productions in Luzira, Kampala. At the end of season three, the revenue strategy changed as NTV Uganda finally commissioned the production of season 4 onwards. NTV Uganda. A revamped Hostel Serenity returned to low expectations, as much of its loyal audience had moved on to shows that had replaced them, such as Deceptions.

== Cast ==
The series cast mostly young celebrity actors plus a few university students. The major cast includes:

- Kuddzu Isaac
- Hellen Lukoma
- Daniel Omara
- Richard Tuwangye
- Taryn Kyaze
- Michael Wawuyo Jr.
- Housen Mushema
- Mumba Benon
- Kayesu Melissa

== Nominations and awards ==
- Nominated for Best TV Show by Teen Buzz Awards
- Rated Uganda's No. 1 TV programme by Synovate Research in 2011 and 2012
