= Situka =

2015 Ugandan film

Situka: A Call for Action
- Directed by: Kwezi Kaganda
- Written by: John Bosco Kyabaggu; Musa Luswatta
- Produced by: Hannington Bugingo
- Starring: Robert Kyagulanyi Ssentamu; Hellen Lukoma; Michael Wawuyo; Simon Base Kalema; Raymond Rushabiro; Joel Okuyo Atiku
- Music by: Bobi Wine
- Production company: Twisted Films
- Distributed by: Twaweza ni Sisi, Twisted Films
- Release date: 24 May 2015
- Running time: 63 Minutes
- Country: Uganda
- Language: English

Situka (A Call for Action) is a Ugandan feature film about two lovers: Amanio (Hellen Lukoma), an ambitious young woman with a passion for politics, who inspires her boyfriend Muganga (Bobi Wine), an industrious young daredevil, to stand up for justice in society.

Situka explores relevant social issues, inspiring young people to be more involved in their communities, rather than expecting the government to provide for them.

== Synopsis ==
Muganga runs a prominent bar near the university. Admired by his peers, he struggles with his purpose and influence until his girlfriend Amanio's life is put at risk. Uganda's political and social services fail her, and Muganga is moved to fight for his love and his people.

== Cast ==
- Bobi Wine as Muganga, an industrious young man and daredevil; Amanio's boyfriend, university graduate, and bar owner
- Hellen Lukoma as Amanio, an ambitious young woman with a passion for politics; Muganga's girlfriend
- Raymond Rushabiro as Kazungu
- Michael Wawuyo as Muwaddada

== Production ==
Production of Situka started in 2015 and in May of the same year, the movie was released at the National Theater, Kampala, with the producer and director Hannington Bugingo praising Bobi Wine as the best Ugandan actor. It was shot on location on Kalangala island district and Masese, Jinja district. Bobi Wine read through the movie script once on the first day of shooting. The film was produced with the support of the youth advocacy NGO Twaweza, with the aim of spreading the message that youths should take action on issues that affect them.
