= Veronica's Wish =

Veronica’s Wish
- Directed by: Rehema Nanfuka
- Written by: Nisha Kalema
- Produced by: Nisha Kalema
- Starring: Nisha Kalema; Housen Mushema; Malaika Nyanzi; Symon Base Kalema; Jayant Maru; Allen Musumba
- Production companies: Jangu Productions: Quad-A Records
- Distributed by: Jangu Productions
- Release date: 17 November 2018
- Country: Uganda
- Language: English

Veronica’s Wish is a Ugandan English-language drama film starring Nisha Kalema (Veronica), Housen Mushema (Michael), Malaika Nyanzi (Bankia), Symon Base Kalema (Frank), Tereza Kabasekyere (Grandma), Kabenge Richard Valentino (Dance Instructor), Jayant Maru and Allen Musumba. It premiered in Uganda on 17 November 2018.

The film was screened at major film festivals around the world including Silicon Valley African Film Festival, Uganda Film Festival and Mashariki African Film Festival and even won nominations and awards at the latter two.

== Plot ==
Michael and Veronica, a couple in love and engaged to marry are faced with challenges as Veronica gets hit by a mysterious illness a few days before their wedding.

== Production and casting ==
When Nisha Kalema created Veronica’s Wish, she first cast Rehema Nanfuka as the lead actress to play Veronica. But when Rehema read the script, she turned down the offer and proposed the role be played by Nisha Kalema herself and instead offered to direct the movie. During her speech at the movie premier, Nisha revealed that she hadn’t thought of casting Housen Mushema as Michael. Malaika Nnyanzi was cast as Bankia, Veronica’s best friend and Frank’s (Symon Base Kalema) girlfriend. In reality, Malaika and Symon Base Kalema are siblings which led to the cutting of their on-camera romance from the script.

== Nominations and awards ==
In the first week of its screening, the film received 11 nominations at the Uganda Film Festival 2018 and later won 9 awards becoming the biggest winner.

Awards & Nominations
Year	Award	Category	Received by	Result	Ref
2019	ZAFAA Global Awards	Best Picture Editor	Nisha Kalema	Nominated	
2019	ZAFAA Global Awards	Best Producer	Nisha Kalema	Nominated	
2019	ZAFAA Global Awards	Best Lead Actor Female	Nisha Kalema	Nominated	
2019	ZAFAA Global Awards	Best Screenplay	Nisha Kalema	Nominated	
2019	ZAFAA Global Awards	Best Supporting Actor Female	Malaika Nnyanzi	Nominated	
2019	ZAFAA Global Awards	Best Lead Actor Male	Housen Mushema	Nominated	
2019	ZAFAA Global Awards	Best Director	Rehema Nanfuka	Nominated	
2019	Sinema Zetu International Film Festival	Best Feature Film		Won	
2019	Sinema Zetu International Film Festival	Best Actress	Nisha Kalema	Won	
2019	Sinema Zetu International Film Festival	Best Director	Rehema Nanfuka	Won	
2019	Silcon Valley African Film Festival	Best Feature Narrative		Won	
2019	Pan African Film Festival, California	Jury Honorable Mention		Won	
2019	Gulu International Film Festival	Best Feature Film		Nominated	
2019	7th Coast Film Festival	Best Director		Nominated	
2019	7th Coast Film Festival	Best Cinematography		Nominated	
2019	7th Coast Film Festival	Best Screenplay		Nominated	
2019	Africa Movie Academy Awards	Best Achievement In Make-Up	Joan Nantege	Nominated	
2019	Mashariki African Film Festival	Best East-African feature		Nominated	
2018	Uganda Film Festival Awards(UFF)	Best Feature Film		Won	
2018	Uganda Film Festival Awards(UFF)	Best Director	Rehema Nanfuka	Won	
2018	Uganda Film Festival Awards(UFF)	Best Actress	Nisha Kalema	Won	
2018	Uganda Film Festival Awards(UFF)	Best Actor (Film)	Housen Mushema	Nominated	
2018	Uganda Film Festival Awards(UFF)	Best Supporting Actor	Symon Base Kalema	Won	
2018	Uganda Film Festival Awards(UFF)	Best Supporting Actress	Malaika Nnyanzi	Nominated	
2018	Uganda Film Festival Awards(UFF)	Best Costume & Production Design		Won	
2018	Uganda Film Festival Awards(UFF)	Best Sound		Won	
2018	Uganda Film Festival Awards(UFF)	Best Editing & Post Production		Won	
2018	Uganda Film Festival Awards(UFF)	Best Cinematography		Won	
2018	Uganda Film Festival Awards(UFF)	Best Script (Screen Play)		Won	

== External ==
- Veronica's WiSH at IMDb
