= Mathew Nabwiso =

Ugandan actor

- Born: Mathew Nabwiso; Uganda
- Education: Busoga College; Namasagali College
- Alma mater: Cyprus Institute of Marketing
- Occupations: Director, producer, writer, cinematographer, actor
- Years active: 1995–present
- Spouse: Eleanor Nabwiso

Mathew Nabwiso, often as Matthew Nabwiso, is a Ugandan actor. Nabwiso is best known for the roles in the films Imbabazi, Rain and Kyaddala. He is also a singer, director and producer.

== Personal life ==
He was born as the seventh child of the family which includes eleven siblings. His parents are former parliamentarian Frank Nabwiso and Mama Christine Nabwiso of Jinja. He attended Mwiri and Kamuli Boys primary schools for primary education. Then he attended Busoga College, Mwiri for his O-level and later attended to Namasagali College, in Kamuli to complete A-level. He later obtained a bachelor's degree in marketing from Cyprus Institute of Marketing.

Before entering acting, he had a full-time job as the sales manager of an ICT company. But he quit the job to pursue a career through cinema.

He is married to fellow actress, Eleanor Nabwiso who also starred in the TV series The Hostel. The couple has four children.

== Career ==
In 2006, he made the maiden cinema acting with the film Battle of the Souls.

In 2011, he joined the cast of televisions series The Hostel aired on NTV Uganda, which became highly popular. After the conclusion of the series, he founded the film production company 'Nabwiso Films'.

In 2013, he won the award for the Best Actor at Africa Magic Viewers' Choice Awards (AMVCA), for the film A Good Catholic Girl. Later in 2016, he was nominated for the role 'Dumba' in the film Rain at AMVCA. In 2020, he received Film Act Award at the Vine Awards for his contribution to the Ugandan cinema.

== Filmography ==
Year	Film	Role	Genre	Ref.
2006	Battle of the Souls	Actor Ryan	Short / sci-fi	
2011	The Hostel	Actor Gilo	Comedy / drama TV series	
2012	Africa First: Volume Two	Actor Ahmed	Drama	
2013	A Good Catholic Girl	Actor Ahmed	Film	
2013	Imbabazi	Gasana	Drama	
2016	Rain	Actor: Dumba, producer	Drama	
2018	Mpeke Town	Actor Paul	Drama / family	
2018	The Mercy of the Jungle	Actor	Crime / drama / war	
2018	#Family (Hashtag Family)	Producer Actor Frank Mpanga	Comedy / drama TV series	
2019	Kyaddala	Actor Mr. G	TV series	
2020	Prickly Roses	Director	Film	
