= Raymond Rushabiro =

Ugandan actor

- Occupation: Actor
- Notable work: The Only Son

Raymond Rushabiro is a Ugandan film and stage actor.

== Career ==
Rushabiro's acting journey began during his school days at the prestigious Namasagali College, where he performed in classic stage plays such as Shakespeare's Julius Caesar. He later studied in Music, Dance, and Drama at Makerere University.

He appeared in Kweezi Kaganda's Any cow will do alongside former Namasagali old students that was shown at the National Theater of Uganda.

Rushabiro broke through in his acting career with Uganda's most famous stage group, the Ebonies, appearing in a number of their plays. He is widely recognized for his versatile performances and extensive career spanning several decades.

His first cinema appearance was as Kasirivu in the movie Bala Bala Sese (2015), directed by Lukyamuzi Bashir. He appeared in supporting roles in the 2016 Ugandan film The Only Son (as Uncle), Situka (2015), and 5 @Home on Fox Life (2015–2018), in which he played a patriarch of the Muwonge family. He worked on other films and television series including Freedom (2016), Girl from Mparo (2016) and Kyaddala (2019). Rushabiro has appeared in numerous local and regional productions, transitioning from stage to successful feature films.

As of 2025, Rushabiro has become an outspoken advocate for the reforms in the Ugandan creative industry. He frequently emphasizes the need for industry leadership and advocacy. He urges more investment in modern equipment and professional training to make Ugandan films globally competitive. He has promoted transparency and honesty in film project funding.

== Career ==
Rushabiro featured in The Torture (2017), a drama highlighting domestic violence that earned him critical acclaim. His performance in Five Days to Live (2018) won him a best actor accolade. For Stain (2021), directed by Morris Mugisha, he also won an award. Rushabiro appeared in 27 Guns, a historical action film based on the bush war that led to the current Ugandan government.

== Awards and recognition ==
Rushabiro was nominated for Best Actor in a Drama (Movie/TV series) in the 2018 Africa Magic Viewers Choice Awards.
