= Uganda Communications Commission =

Communications regulator of Uganda

- UCC

Agency overview
- Formed: 1997
- Jurisdiction: Uganda
- Headquarters: UCC House; 42-44 Spring Road; Bugoloobi, Kampala
- Agency executives: Eng. Dr Dorothy Okello, Chairperson; George William Nyombi Thembo, Executive Director
- Parent agency: Parastatal
- Website: Homepage

The Uganda Communications Commission (UCC) is the government regulatory body of the communications sector in Uganda. Although owned by the Ugandan government, it acts independently. Its mandated responsibilities include licensing, regulation, communications infrastructure development and the expansion of rural communications service.

== Location ==
The headquarters of the UCC are located at 42-44 Spring Road, in Bugoloobi, a neighborhood in Nakawa Division, in Kampala, the capital of Uganda and the largest city in that country. Other regional offices are located in Gulu, Mbale, Masindi and Mbarara.

== History ==
UCC was created by the Communications Act enacted in 1997, by the Ugandan Parliament. That instrument, split the then Ugandan parastatal, Uganda Posts and Telecommunications Company Limited (UPTCL), into four entities:

- Uganda Communications Commission (UCC) – The communications industry regulator
- Uganda Post Limited – Also known as Posta Uganda
- PostBank Uganda – A government-owned financial institution
- Uganda Telecom – An information technology and communication network company.

In January 2021, Uganda Communications Commission ordered the shutdown of the Internet in Uganda, amid elections.

== Organization and operations ==
The organizational structure of the commission, is laid out in detail at the Communications Commission's web site.

The Communications Commission runs a film festival to promote the country's film industry.

== Rural Communications ==
The Rural Communications Development Fund (RCDF) was founded in 2003 and is responsible for the development of communications infrastructure outside of Uganda's urban centers. The RCDF has set standards for its work in the 112 districts of the country. RCDF's scope of work includes: (a) creation of internet points of presence (b) internet training centers (c) creation of internet cafes at every district headquarters (d) creation of web portals for every district (e) maintenance of pay telephones at the ratio of at least one for every 2500 people (f) development of postal projects, Multi-purpose Community Telecentres (MCTs), internet development for schools & health care facilities and (g) development of call centres.

== Governance ==
The chairman of the seven-member communications board is Eng Dr Dorothy Okello. Other board members include; Evelyn Piloya, Jane Kabbale, Rajab Wardah Gyagenda, William Byaruhanga, Norah Muliira and Charles Lwanga Auk. The executive director in acting capacity from 2019 until November 2023, was Irene Sewankambo, the UCC Director of Engineering and Communication Infrastructure. On 24 November 2023, George William Nyombi Thembo was appointed as the substantive ED of UCC.

== Initiatives ==
- Uganda Film Festival - A five-day annual event aimed at promoting and developing the Ugandan film industry. The festival started in 2013. Workshops, trainings, screenings and outreach projects and the Uganda Film Festival Awards are part of the festival.

== See also ==
- KCCA
- Uganda Government
- Uganda Communications
- EAC Postal History
- Bugoloobi
