= Michael Wawuyo Jr. =

Ugandan actor (born 1986)

- Born: Wawuyo Michael Junior; 17 December 1986 (age 39); Kampala, Uganda
- Education: Uganda Christian University, Makerere College School
- Occupation: Actor
- Years active: 2007–present
- Known for: Beneath The Lies, Yat Madit, The Girl in the Yellow Jumper, Sixteen Rounds
- Father: Michael Wawuyo

Michael Wawuyo Jr. (born 17 December 1986) is a Ugandan film actor filmmaker and producer. He is known for his breakout as Brother John in the popular Ugandan hit television series The Hostel (season 1) on NTV. Wawuyo Jr. has become a central figure in modern Ugandan cinema, notably starring in some of the country's first films to reach international streaming platforms like Netflix. He has featured in movies including Beneath The Lies - The Series, Yat Madit, Kyenvu, Nsiwe, Girl in the yellow jumper and most recently Sixteen Rounds. In 2025, he joined the cast of the drama series Crossroads as Leo, a fixer. He recently produced the film Boy No Fear, directed by American Jonathan Curtis.

== Early life ==
Wawuyo is the son of actor and special effects director Wawuyo Michael.

Wawuyo attended Lohana Academy and Makerere College School. He played Jesus at Lohana Academy. At Makerere College School he played Njoroge, from Ngugi wa Thiong’o and Ngugi wa Mirii's play I Will Marry When I Want. He did information science at Uganda Christian University. He previously appeared together with his father in The Right to Life, Stone Cold, and The Bullion.

He is an advocate for the sickle cell awareness, a cause close to his family as his mother, Anne Mugoya Wawuyo, battles the condition.

== Filmography ==
=== Television ===
Year	Title	Role	Notes
2023	African Folktales, Reimagined	Omar	1 episode
2016	Yat Madit	Opio	
2014	Beneath The Lies - The Series	Shaban	4 episodes
2011	The Hostel	Brother John	

=== Film ===
Year	Title	Role	Notes	References
2014	Bullion		Crime / drama Alongside Carol Agudo	
2015	A Dog Story	Bongwat	Short film	
2016	Rain	Kalule	Drama	
2016	Funeral Scene	Gabby	Short drama	
2017	Love Faces	Burglar	Drama / romance / thriller	
2018	27 Guns	Joram Mugume	Action / adventure / biography	
2018	Kyenvu	Him	Short film	
2018	The Mercy of the Jungle	Refugee	Crime / drama / war	
2019	Bed of Thornes	Robert	Drama	
2019	N.s.i.w.e	Jordan		
2020	The Girl in the Yellow Jumper	Jim Akena	Release interrupted by COVID-19 pandemic	
	Kafa Coh	Mule	Feature	
2021	The Blind Date	Sam/Jeff	Short film directed by Loukman Ali	
2021	Sixteen Rounds	Cpt. Damba	Sequel to The Blind Date	
2022	Kafa Coh	Mule	Produced by Doreen Mirembe	
2023	Ubuntu Uppercut	The Dad	Short / action	
