= Eleanor Nabwiso =

Ugandan actress, producer and director (born 1989)

- Born: Eleanor Vaal Nansibo Nabwiso; February 24, 1989 (age 37); Sir Albert Cook Mengo Hospital
- Occupations: actress, producer, director
- Known for: Beneath the Lies - The Series
- Spouse: Matthew Nabwiso
- Children: 4
- Parents: Dr. Kefa Sempangi (father); Jane Frances Nakamya. (mother)
- Awards: Best Actress in TV Drama in the Uganda Film Festival Awards 2019

Eleanor Vaal Nansibo Nabwiso (born 24 February 1989) is a Ugandan actress, producer, director and television personality. She is known for her work on The Hostel, Rain, Beneath the Lies - The Series and Bed of Thorns as the director. She also owns a production company called Nabwiso Films which she set up together with her husband Matthew Nabwiso.

== Life and background ==
Nabwiso was born at Sir Albert Cook Mengo Hospital to a retired politician, Rev. Dr. Kefa Sempangi and Jane Frances Nakamya. Nabwiso is the third of the five children. Her father, who founded the Presbyterian Church in Uganda, he was also an instrumental figure in the ministry to the street children in Uganda in 1971 under the banner of The Africa Foundation.

== Education ==
Nabwiso completed her primary education at Namagunga Girls' Primary School. She then joined Seeta High School Mukono for her O and A Levels she joined and Sikkim Manipal University where she graduated with a degree in science in IT.

== Career ==
Her acting and film producing journey started when she was a teenager. During her Senior Six vacation she was picked to present a weekend program, K-Files on WBS TV. She acted in The Hostel a Ugandan drama series created by Sabiiti "MMC" Moses and Emanuel "BUUBA" Egwel about the lives of university students in their hostels. She acted in Kyaddala a pan-African television drama series created by Emmanuel Ikubese for Emmanuel Ikubese Films and Reach a Hand Uganda as Bursar, #Family (Hashtag Family) TV series as Jackie Mpanga, Beneath The Lies is a Ugandan television drama-mystery series created by Nana Kagga Macpherson as Nancy, Watch Over Me as Lynnet. Bed of Thorns (#Tosirika) is a Ugandan, all-female crew produced drama film directed by her and produced at Nabwiso Films.

== Awards and nominations ==
She won the Best Actress in TV Drama in the Uganda Film Festival Awards 2019, and was nominated and won the London Arthouse Film Festivale Award, Africa Focus Award for Best Feature Film, both for the film Bed of Thorns.

== Personal life ==
She is married to fellow actor and singer Matthew Nabwiso and they have four children together.
