= Uganda Film Festival Awards =

Film and television awards in Uganda

- Awarded for: Excellence in cinematic achievements
- Country: Uganda
- Presented by: Uganda Communications Commission
- First award: 2013
- Website: ugandafilmfestival.ug

The Uganda Film Festival Awards, also known as UFF Awards, are presented annually to recognize excellence in the film Industry in Uganda. The awards started in 2013 under a Uganda Communications Commission initiative to recognize and develop the Ugandan film industry. Nominated films are screened at a five-day festival that also runs training, workshops, exhibitions and outreaches. The awarding night marks the helm of the film festival that runs for three days.

== Award categories ==
Categories for television were introduced in 2016, while film categories started with the awards in 2013. The following is the list of categories awarded by the Uganda Film Festival Awards as of 2019.

- Best Cinematography
- Best Costumes (Production design)
- Best Sound
- Best Screenplay (Script)
- Best Student Film
- Best Animation
- Best Short Film
- Best Feature Film
- People’s Choice Award
- Best Actor
- Best Actress
- Best Documentary
- Best East African Film
- Best Post-production/Editing
- Best TV Drama/Series
- Best Actor in a TV Drama
- Best Actress in a TV Drama
- Special Award/Life Achievement Award
- Best Director
- Best Supporting Actress
- Best Supporting Actor
- Best African Film Award

== Records ==
=== Most nominations per year ===
==== By a film ====
Year	Film	Nominations	Ref
2023	The Passenger, Kafa Coh, When You Become Me	11	
2019	Laila	11	
2018	Veronica's Wish	11	
2017	Devil's Chest	9	
2016	Freedom	9	
2015	The Tailor	9	
2014	The Felistas Fable	4	
2013	Okusaalimba (The Trespass)	4	

==== Television ====
Year	Film	Nominations	Ref
2021	What If	4	
2021	Prestige	4	
2018	Mistakes Girls Do	5	
2016	Coffee Shop	4	
2016	Deception	4	
2017	Yat Madit	3	
2017	Mistakes Girls Do	3	
2019	#Family	3	
2019	The Honourables	3	

=== Most wins per year ===
==== By a film ====
Year	Film	Wins	Ref
2023	The Passenger	5	
2019	Laila	4	
2019	Bed of Thorns	4	
2018	Veronica's Wish	9	
2017	Devil's Chest	4	
2016	Freedom	6	
2015	House Arrest	5	
2014	The Felistas Fable	4	
2013	State Research Bureau (S.R.B)	3	

==== Television ====
Year	Film	Wins	Ref
2017	Yat Madit	3	
2016	Coffee Shop	3	
2019	#Family	2	
2018	Mistakes Girls Do	2	

== Special Jury Awards ==
- 2023 - Hakim Zziwa
