= List of awards and nominations received by Usama Mukwaya =

Usama Mukwaya awards and nominations
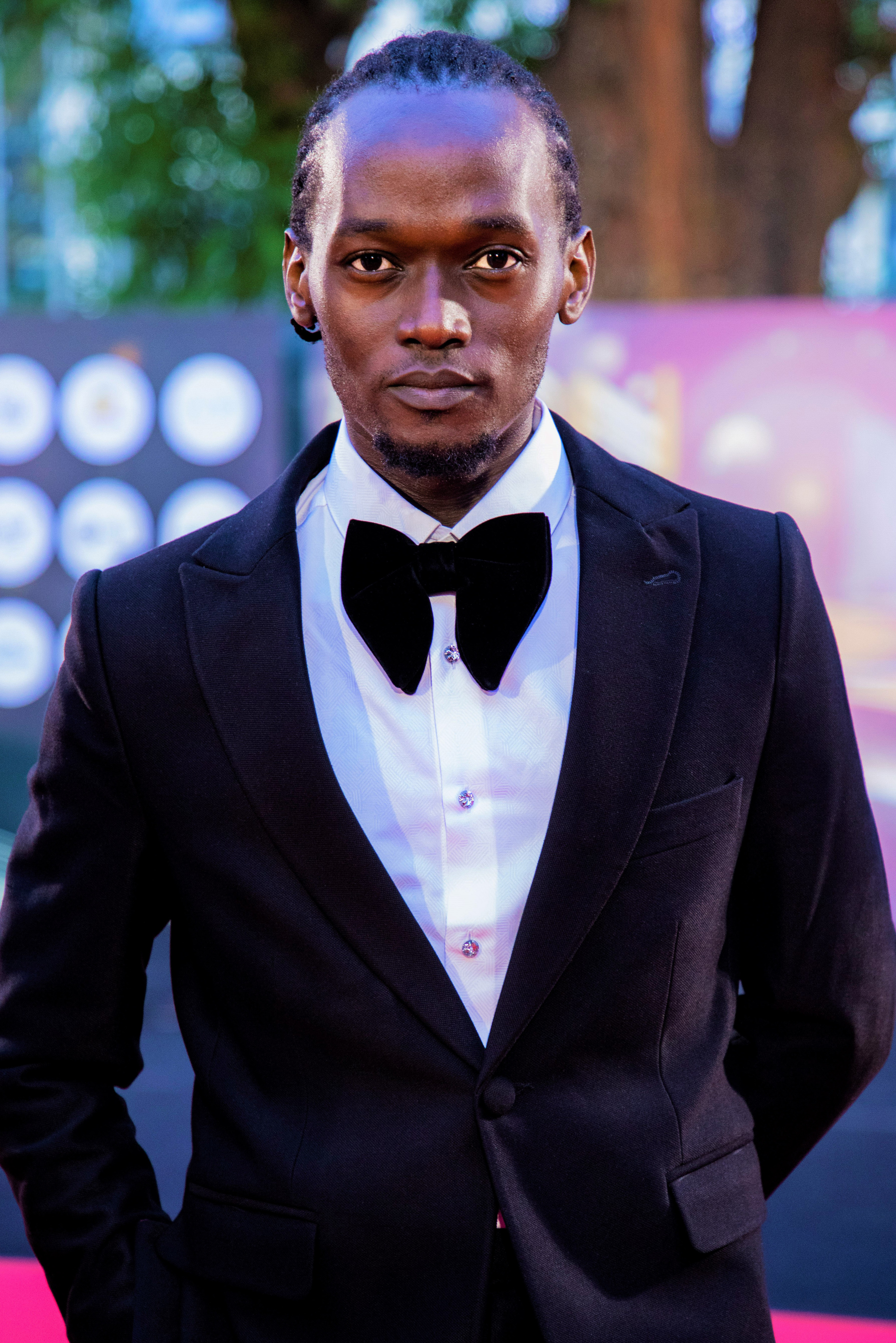
- Mukwaya at the IKON Awards in March 2023
Awards and nominations (Note: Certain award groups do not simply award one winner. They recognize several different recipients, have runners-up, and have third place. Since this is a specific recognition, and is different from losing an award, runner-up mentions are considered wins in this award tally. Awards in certain categories do not have prior nominations, and only winners are announced by the jury. For simplification, and to avoid errors, each award in this list has been presumed to have had a prior nomination.)
Award	Wins	Nominations
Totals
Africa Movie Academy Awards	0	1
AMVCAs	0	3
Wins	15
Nominations	41

The following is a list of awards and nominations received by Ugandan screenwriter, film director and producer Usama Mukwaya. His major nominations include the Africa Movie Academy Award for Best Film in an African Language for the 2016 film Bala Bala Sese and three nominations at the Africa Magic Viewers' Choice Awards, two for the 2023 film, The Passenger and best short film for the 2021 film Sixteen Rounds.

== Major associations ==
=== Africa Magic Viewers' Choice Awards ===
Africa Magic Viewers' Choice Awards (AMVCA) is an annual accolade presented by MultiChoice recognizing outstanding achievement in television and film.The inaugural Africa Magic Viewers’ Choice Awards ceremony was held in Lagos, Lagos State in Nigeria on 9 March 2013, and was broadcast live in more than 50 countries. Entries into the award ceremony are films and TV series that have been aired in the previous year.

Year	Nominated work	Category	Result	Ref.
2024	The Passenger	Best Indigenous M-Net Original	Nominated	
2024	The Passenger	Best Scripted M-Net Original	Nominated	
2023	Sixteen Rounds	Best Short film	Nominated	

=== Africa Movie Academy Awards ===
The Africa Movie Academy Awards, popularly known as AMAA and The AMA Awards, are presented annually to recognize excellence of professionals in the African film industry.

Year	Nominated work	Category	Result	Ref.
2016	Bala Bala Sese	Best Film in an African Language	Nominated	

== Other awards and nominations ==
=== Africa Golden Awards ===
The Africa Golden Awards honors top achievers driving Africa's progress in entrepreneurship, innovation, arts, technology, humanitarian work, and beyond.

Year	Category	Result	Ref.
2025	Best Script Writer	Nominated	
2026	Top African Film Producer	Nominated	

=== Janzi Awards ===
The Janzi Awards are envisioned as an inclusive experience where outstanding achievements, innovations and diversity in Uganda's Cultural, Creative and Performing Arts forms are recognized and celebrated.

Year	Category	Nominated work	Result	Ref.
2021	Outstanding Producer	Sixteen Rounds, The Blind Date	Won	

=== Magic Vibe Awards ===
Magic Vibe Awards is the sole East Africa Awards Ceremony and music festival in the diaspora. They cater to all music genres including film and sports.

Year	Nominated work	Category	Result	Ref.
2023	-	Best East African Film Director	Nominated	

=== New Vision Peoples Choice Film Awards ===
The New Vision People's Choice Film Awards, also known as NVFilmAwards, is an event that recognizes the talent and achievements of Uganda's film industry. The awards are voted for by the public, who consume the films produced..

Year	Category	Nominated work	Result	Ref.
2024	Best Short Film	Nambi	Nominated	

=== Viewers Choice Movie Awards (Uganda) ===
Year	Category	Nominated work	Result	Ref.
2017	Best Screenplay	Love Faces	Nominated	
2017	Best Picture	Love Faces	Nominated	
2017	Film of the Year	Love Faces	Won	
2017	Best Director	Love Faces	Nominated	
2017	Best Screenplay	Rehema	Nominated	

== Film festival awards ==
=== Africa International Film Festival ===
The Africa International Film Festival (AFRIFF) is an annual film festival. The event normally spans through a week and it includes award shows and film training classes.

Year	Nominated work	Category	Result	Ref.
2016	Bala Bala Sese	Best Feature Film	Nominated	

=== Amakula International Film Festival ===
The Amakula International Film Festival is an annual film festival that takes place in Uganda. It is Uganda's oldest film festival founded by Dutch film historian Alice Smits and American filmmaker Lee Elickson.

Year	Nominated work	Category	Result	Ref.
2026	Call 112	Golden Impala Award for Best Short Film	Won	
2018	Love Faces	Golden Impala Award for Best Feature Film	Nominated	
2018	Rehema	Golden Impala Award for Best Short Film	Nominated	
2016	Bala Bala Sese	Golden Impala Award for Best African Film	Nominated	

=== Durban International Film Festival ===
The Durban International Film Festival (DIFF) is an annual film festival that takes place in Durban, KwaZulu-Natal province, South Africa. Founded in 1979 by Teddy Sarkin and Ros Sarkin, it is the oldest and largest film festival in Africa and presents over 200 screenings celebrating the best in South African, African and international cinema. Most of the screenings are either African or South African premieres.

Year	Nominated work	Category	Result	Ref.
2022	Sixteen Rounds	Best Short Film	Won	
2021	The Blind Date	Best Short Film	Nominated	
2017	Rehema	Best Short Film	Nominated	

=== Helsinki African Film Festival ===
Year	Nominated work	Category	Result	Ref.
2016	Bala Bala Sese	Jury Award for Human Rights and Social Commentary	Nominated	

=== Juba Film Festival ===
The Juba Film Festival (JFF) is an annual film festival held in Juba, South Sudan. Founded in 2016 by filmmaker Simon Bingo, the festival is attended by thousands of people every year. In addition to producing the festival, JFF produces films and provides training in filmmaking.

Year	Category	Nominated work	Result	Ref.
2025	Best Foreign Film	Call 112	Won	

=== Kortfilmfestival Kalmthout ===
Year	Nominated work	Category	Result	Ref.
2023	Nambi	Best International short film - Audience award	Won	

=== Luxor African Film Festival ===
Year	Nominated work	Category	Result	Ref.
2026	Call 112	Short Film Competition	Nominated	
2022	Sixteen Rounds	Short Film Competition	Special Mention	
2016	Bala Bala Sese	Grand Nile Prize (Long Narrative)	Nominated	

=== Malawi International Film Festival ===
Year	Nominated work	Category	Result	Ref.
2023	The Passenger	Best International Feature Film	Won	

=== Mashariki African Film Festival ===
Mashariki African Film Festival is an international film festival based in Rwanda, that represent the country in the East African Film Network (EAFN).

Year	Nominated work	Category	Result	Ref.
2023	The Passenger	Long Feature Fiction	Nominated	
2021	Kyaddala	Best TV and web series	Nominated	
2021	Sixteen Rounds	Best Short Film	Won	
2015	Tiktok	Best Short Film	Nominated	

=== Nador Cinema Festival ===
Year	Nominated work	Category	Result	Ref.
2018	Rehema	Best Short Film	Nominated	

=== Nile Diaspora International Film Festival ===
Year	Nominated work	Category	Result	Ref.
2013	In Just Hours	Best Short Film	Nominated	

=== Pearl International Film Festival ===
The Pearl International Film Festival (PIFF), is an annual film festival held in Kampala, Uganda and has been described as one of the biggest film events in Uganda.

Year	Nominated work	Category	Result	Ref.
2023	The Passenger	Best Feature	Nominated	
2017	Rehema	Best Short Film	Nominated	
2014	In Just Hours	Best Student Film	Nominated	

=== Uganda Film Festival ===
The Uganda Film Festival (UFF), is an annual film festival held in Kampala, Uganda founded under the Uganda Communications Commission. The festival is intended to help showcase what the industry is doing and at the same time focusing attention to all the other facets of the industry.

Year	Nominated work	Category	Result	Ref.
2026	Kavule Town	Best Television Drama	Nominated	
2024	9 Lives	Best Short Film	Nominated	
2023	The Passenger	Best Feature Film	Nominated	
2023	The Passenger	Best Film In Indigenous Language	Won	
2023	The Passenger	Viewer's Choice	Nominated	
2023	Nambi	Best Short Film	Nominated	
2022	Sixteen Rounds	Best Short Film	Nominated	
2022	Kyaddala	Best Television Drama	Nominated	
2021	The Blind Date	Best Short Film	Won	
2017	Love Faces	Best Production Design/ Costume Design	Nominated	
2017	Rehema	Best Short Film	Won	

=== Zanzibar International Film Festival ===
Year	Nominated work	Category	Result	Ref.
2024	The Passenger	Golden Dhow for Best Feature Film	Nominated	

== Film industry awards ==
=== MNFPAC ===
Mariam Ndagire Film and Performing Arts Centre is a Uganda-based training film initiative for emerging Ugandan filmmakers and mentorship programme for aspiring filmmakers and youth in Uganda.

Year	Nominated work	Category	Result	Ref.
2010	Hello	Best Screenplay	Nominated	

=== Movie Furnace ===
Movie Furnace (Tanuulu) is a Uganda-based non-profit short film competition, for Mariam Ndagire Film and Performing Arts Centre alumni (MNFPAC), founded by Mariam Ndagire.

Year	Nominated work	Category	Result	Ref.
2013	In Just Hours	Best Director	Won	
2012	Smart Attempt	Best Director	Finalist	

== Miscellaneous awards and honors ==
=== AFRICA 100 – League of Exceptionals (2026) ===
Usama was selected as one of the AFRICA 100 – League of Exceptionals 2026, in recognition to his remarkable achievements, outstanding contributions, and transformative impact. The awards are organised by the African Youth Leadership Foundation.

=== The Forty under 40 Africa awards (2026) ===
Mukwaya was nominated for the 2026 Forty Under 40 Africa Awards in the Music and Entertainment category. The Forty under 40 Africa Awards is to identify, honour and celebrate a cross-section of the continents most influential and accomplished young business leaders under the age forty from a wide range of industries, who are committed to business growth, professional excellence and community service and have risen up the ranks of their companies or industries at a relatively young age as result of this.

=== Fellow of the Young & Emerging Leaders Project (CLASS OF 2019) ===
The Young & Emerging Leaders Project (YELP) is an initiative of the LéO Africa Institute, which has been ongoing since 2017, that annually inducts 20-30 outstanding thought leaders into a fellowship program designed to train and orient values of self-advancement, integrity, social responsibility, and socioeconomic transformation.

=== Film and Television Award - Young Achievers Awards 2011 ===
The Young Achievers Awards is a national competition held annually in Uganda which selects and promotes the best practice and excellence in youth creativity.

=== Trailblazer Award - MNFPAC (CLASS OF 2010) ===
The Mariam Ndagire Film and Performing Arts Centre awarded Usama the trailblazer award during the institutes' 2020 graduation as an exceptional student for his outstanding contribution towards the Ugandan entertainment industry. On the very event, Usama received a diploma in film directing and screenwriting from now a fully recognized training institute by Directorate of Industrial Training.

== See also ==
- List of awards and nominations received by Usama Mukwaya at IMDb
