= Call 112 =

Ugandan short film

- Call 112 Official Poster
- Directed by: Usama Mukwaya
- Screenplay by: Meddy Sserwadda; Usama Mukwaya
- Produced by: Hadijah Nakanjako
- Starring: Mariam Ndagire; Blair Koono; Kenny Rukundo
- Cinematography: Alex Ireeta
- Music by: Tonny Timothy Kasoma
- Production company: O Studios Entertainment
- Release date: 30 April 2025
- Running time: 39 minutes
- Country: Uganda
- Language: English

Call 112 is a 2025 Ugandan film directed by Usama Mukwaya starring Mariam Ndagire Blair Koono and Kenny Rukundo in leading roles. The short film produced by O Studios Entertainment with support from Konrad-Adenauer-Stiftung (KAS) Uganda and South Sudan, is set during a heated parliamentary election campaign in the fictional Kebambe West constituency. It premiered on 30 April 2025 in Kampala.

== Plot ==
James, a cash-strapped university student and TikTok influencer, lands a lucrative gig exposing the secrets of Teopista Ndyanabo, a prominent woman MP, on behalf of the enigmatic Albert. As Teopista faces intense scrutiny while seeking re-election as MP for Kebambe West, a massive disinformation campaign unleashes false rumors about her family, including the paternity of her children. However, as James becomes entangled in the scandal, he realizes too late that he's in over his head.

== Cast ==
- Mariam Ndagire as Teopista Ndyanabo
- Blair Koono as James
- Kenny Rukundo as Albert
- Peter Odeke as Goliath Ndyanabo
- Timothy Lwanga as Muwanga Mukasa
- Reef Sserwadda as Bbosa
- Ethan Kavuma as Roger
- Florence Yiga as Haluwa

== Awareness campaign ==
As part of the film’s premiere, a campaign titled Love Facts was launched an engaging, holistic, and humorous pro-debunking initiative designed to spark a movement among young people that embraces facts through fun, food, and creativity. Speaking at the event, Anna Reismann, Country Representative for KAS Uganda and South Sudan, noted that the film illustrated how disinformation spreads in the digital age. She emphasized that influencers have become major sources of information for youth, but are increasingly being targeted by those seeking to fuel conflict and sow chaos.

== Awards and Nominations ==
Blair Koono (left) receives the Golden Impala Award for Best Short film for Call 112

Awards & Nominations
| Year | Award | Category | Result | Ref |
|---|---|---|---|---|
| 2025 | Juba Film Festival | Best Foreign Film | Won | |
| 2026 | Luxor African Film Festival | The Grand Nile Prize for Short Film | Nominated | |
| 2026 | Amakula International Film Festival | Golden Impala Award for Best Short Film | Won | |
