= Rehema =

- Directed by: Allan Manzi
- Screenplay by: Usama Mukwaya
- Produced by: Usama Mukwaya; Allan Manzi
- Starring: Juliet Zansaanze; Raymond Rushabiro; Ismael Ssesanga
- Cinematography: Alex Ireeta
- Production companies: Manzi Media, O Studios Entertainment
- Release date: 19 July 2017 (South Africa)
- Running time: 20 minutes
- Country: Uganda
- Languages: Luganda; English

Rehema is 2017 Ugandan film directed by Allan Manzi, based upon a screenplay by Usama Mukwaya and starring Juliet Zansaanze, Raymond Rushabiro and Ismael Ssesanga. The film premiered at the 38th Durban International Film Festival in South Africa. It held a special screening at the 4th Edition of the Euro Uganda Film Festival on 17 June 2018 courtesy of the British Council.

== Plot ==
Rehema (Juliet Zansaanze) is in love with Sula (Ismael Ssesanga) but secretively her uncle (Raymond Rushabiro) and grandfather are plotting to marry her to someone else older because of his money. She powerfully rejects the marriage but an accident happens while fighting with her uncle and he dies leaving her imprisoned for Murder. Rehema now has to face the force of law while she fights for justice and her dreams.

== Cast ==
- Juliet Zansaanze as Rehema
- Raymond Rushabiro as Hakim
- Ismael Ssesanga as Sula
- Eddy Mulindwa as Mzee
- Allen Musumba as Friend
- Veronica Nakayo as Counsel

== Production ==
Principal photography on Rehema began early 2016.

== Awards ==
=== Won ===
- 2017: Best Short Film, Uganda Film Festival

=== Nominated ===
- 2017: Best Short Film, 7th Pearl International Film Festival
- 2018: Best Short Film, Amakula International Film Festival
- 2018: Best Short Film, Viewer's Choice Movie Awards
- 2018: Costume Design, Viewer's Choice Movie Awards
- 2018: Best Actress, Viewer's Choice Movie Awards
- 2018: Best Short Film, Nador Cinema Festival
