= In Just Hours =

- Directed by: Usama Mukwaya
- Written by: Usama Mukwaya
- Produced by: Mariam Ndagire
- Starring: Ssentongo Isaac; Allen Musumba; Veronica Nakayo
- Cinematography: Kugonza Isaac
- Edited by: Emanuel Bukenya
- Release date: July 2013
- Country: Uganda
- Language: Luganda/ English

In Just Hours is a Ugandan short drama film written and directed by Usama Mukwaya. Produced through the Mariam Ndagire Film and Performing Arts Centre under the Movie Furnace project, the movie won the best film in the competition's second season. It premiered in the Nile Diaspora International Film Festival and later screened at the Manya Human Rights Film Festival. It was also nominated in the 4th Pearl International Film Festival for best student film under the MNFPAC.

== Plot ==
Peter is about to be surprised by a mysterious, crude condition from the disease he has been suffering from. Weirdly, the condition he is suffering from is only about to get fatal in the next few hours and if not treated quickly and carefully, he might not be sexually productive again.

== Cast ==
- Ssentongo Isaac as Peter
- Allen Musumba as Rose
- Veronica Nakayo
- Shafique Ssenyange
- Ssumaya Nakintu

== Feature film adaptation ==
A feature film based on the same story is in development.
