= Love Faces (film) =

- Film poster
- Directed by: Usama Mukwaya
- Written by: Usama Mukwaya
- Produced by: Bobby Tamale; Usama Mukwaya
- Starring: Laura Kahunde; Moses Kiboneka Jr.; Patriq Nkakalukanyi; Sally Salome Elizabeth Bwamimpeke
- Cinematography: Alex Ireeta
- Edited by: Usama Mukwaya
- Production companies: O Studios Entertainment, Tamz Productions
- Distributed by: Côte Ouest Audiovisuel
- Release dates: August 31, 2017 (Uganda Film Festival); January 4, 2018 (Worldwide)
- Running time: 124 minutes
- Country: Uganda
- Language: English

Love Faces is a Ugandan drama thriller film written and directed by Usama Mukwaya. It is Mukwaya's feature film directorial debut, and stars Laura Kahunde, Moses Kiboneka Jr., Patriq Nkakalukanyi and Sally Salome Elizabeth Bwamimpeke in leading roles. The film had a special screening on 31 August 2017 at the Uganda Film Festival 2017. It had its official release on 4 January 2018.

== Plot ==
Sherry decides to break up with her longtime love Joshua after a disagreement. Joshua's best friend Salim, who wants them to make peace, intervenes. Maria, Sherry's workmate shows up to help her move out. When Maria and Salim are away, a burglar breaks into the house with Joshua and Sherry inside. Joshua realizes after the incident that he still loves her and wants to take all that has happened back. However, Sherry has already made up her mind to leave.

== Cast ==
- Laura Kahunde as Sherry
- Moses Kiboneka Jr. as Joshua
- Patriq Nkakalukanyi as Salim
- Sally Salome Elizabeth Bwamimpeke as Maria
- John Iwueke as Zed
- Vince Drey as Jalo
- Raymond Rushabiro as Uncle
- Bobby Tamale as Marvin
- Michael Wawuyo Jr. as Burglar
- Lary Chary as Self
- Juliet Kukiriza as Maid

== Production ==
Principal photography began in September 2016. The film was shot entirely in Kampala, Uganda. Usama teamed up again with Laura Kahunde (Hello) and Patriq Nkakalukanyi (Tiktok) alongside debut film actor Moses Kiboneka Jr. who replaced Michael Wawuyo Jr. due to a conflicting schedule. Actors Raymond Rushabiro and Allen Musumba from Usama's previous films also made special appearances. The film features original songs by Lary Chary, A Pass, Sheebah Karungi and Ykee Benda on the soundtrack.

== Release ==
Love Faces had its theatrical release on 4 January 2018. The film was also screened at the 11th edition of the Amakula International Film Festival.

== Awards ==
=== Won ===
- 2017: Best Cinematography, 7th Pearl International Film Festival
- 2018: Best Cinematography, Viewer's Choice Movie Awards
- 2018: Best Picture, Viewer's Choice Movie Awards

=== Nominated ===
- 2017: Best Costume Design and Production Design, Uganda Film Festival
- 2018: Best Feature Film, Amakula International Film Festival
- 2018: Best Screenplay, Viewer's Choice Movie Awards
- 2018: Best Film of the Year, Viewer's Choice Movie Awards
- 2018: Best Sound, Viewer's Choice Movie Awards
- 2018: Best Film Director, Viewer's Choice Movie Awards
- 2018: Best Supporting Actor, Viewer's Choice Movie Awards
- 2018: Best Lead Actor, Viewer's Choice Movie Awards
- 2018: Best Supporting Actor, Viewer's Choice Movie Awards
- 2018: Best Supporting Actress, Viewer's Choice Movie Awards

== Sequel ==
On November 24, 2018, it was announced on the film's official Facebook page that a sequel was in development with Usama Mukwaya producing, and Patriq Nkakalukanyi, Salome Elizabeth B and Moses Kiboneka Jr. reprising their roles.
