= Movie Furnace =

Uganda-based non-profit short film competition

Movie Furnace (Tanuulu) is a Uganda-based non-profit short film competition, for Mariam Ndagire Film and Performing Arts Centre alumni (MNFPAC) founded by Mariam Ndagire. The program involves film production, screenwriting, directing, cinematography, editing, sound recording and acting, The winning team headed by the director wins 1000 USD.

== History ==
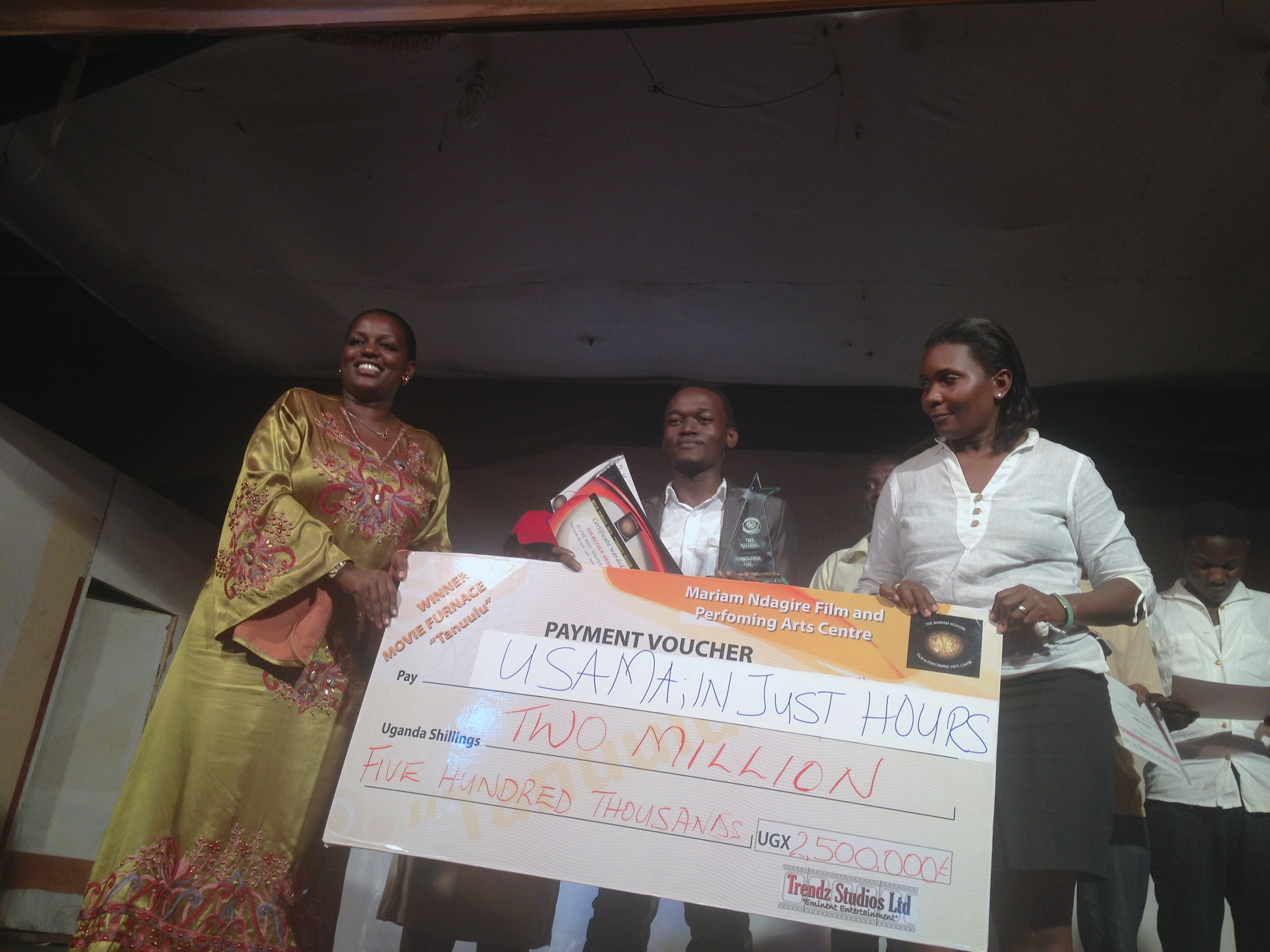
Usama receiving his winning price

Movie Furnace was established in 2012. The first winner was Bigaruka Hakim with his movie Bloody Sunset. The second round was won by Usama Mukwaya with his film In Just Hours. The 3rd Season was won by Sewava Ivan with his movie LIFT FROM HELL
