= Laura Kahunde =

Ugandan actress (born 1988)

- Born: Laura Frida Kahunzirwenkwanzi; 23 October 1988 (age 37); Kampala, Uganda
- Occupations: Performing artist, television host
- Years active: 2008–present
- Notable work: Kyaddala, Love Face, Our Perfect Wedding Uganda, Chapters
- Parents: Prince (Omubiito) Gerald Philip Manyindo (father); Catherine Byabusa Kabasomi (mother)
- Relatives: Juliana Kanyomozi (sister); Rukidi IV (cousin); Princess Elizabeth of Tooro (paternal aunt)

Laura Kahunde (born 23 October 1988) is a Ugandan performing artist and television presenter. She hosts Our Perfect Wedding Uganda, a reality show that follows Ugandan couples from the wedding preparations to the actual wedding day.

She also currently plays Jussy on Kyaddala, a pan-African story told through the lives of university friends exploring sexual reproductive health, rights and challenges, among other social issues. She portrayed Catherine Musoke on the series Chapters on Pearl Magic Prime, and Angella Byekwaso on NTV's Second Chance (Ugandan telenovela) She also starred in Mariam Ndagire's films Hearts in Pieces alongside Abby Mukiibi Nkaaga, Dear Mum, and in My Husband's Wife Where We Belong, She also starred in Usama Mukwaya's Hello which won her Best Actress at the 2011 Mariam Ndagire Film and Performing Arts Centre Student Awards. She appeared in a Henry Ssali film, Bullion with her sister Juliana Kanyomozi. She worked with Usama Mukwaya again on his upcoming film Love Faces alongside Moses Kiboneka Jr. and Patriq Nkakalukanyi, and a Douglas Dubois Sebamala film, Black Glove.

== Personal life ==
Laura Kahunzirwenkwanzi "Kahunde" was born 23 October 1988. She is the last born of Prince (Omubiito) Gerald Philip Manyindo Atwooki and Catherine Kabasomi Byabusa Abwooli (Omugo w'Omubiito Manyindo). and is a Princess (Omubiitokati) of the Tooro Kingdom (one of the four traditional kingdoms located within the borders of what is today Uganda), granddaughter of King Rukidi III of Tooro 11th Omukama of Tooro Kingdom and first cousin of King Rukidi IV and sister to singer and actress Juliana Kanyomozi. They appear together in the movie Bullion.
