= Usama Mukwaya =

Ugandan filmmaker (born 1989)

- Mukwaya at the 2025 Uganda Film Festival
- Born: Usama Mukwaya; 12 December 1989 (age 36); Mulago, Kampala, Uganda
- Citizenship: Uganda
- Education: Cavendish University (Diploma in Business administration); MNFPAC (Diploma in film directing and screenwriting)
- Occupations: Film director; screenwriter; film producer
- Years active: 2010–present
- Title: CEO of O Studios Entertainment (2014–present); DOO of iKON Aspire Foundation (2024–present)
- Father: Abdullah Mukwaya
- Awards: Full list
- Website: usamamukwaya.com

Usama (/ʊˈsɑːmə/) "Osam" Nyanzi Mukwaya (born 12 December 1989) is a Ugandan film and television producer, screenwriter and director. He has received various accolades, including nominations for an Ama Award and three Amvca Awards.

He launched his filmmaking career with the short film Hello, which won overall best film in the 2010 MNFPAC Students Awards. His first feature film as a producer was Bala Bala Sese, directed by Lukyamuzi Bashir, for which Mukwaya is credited as both the writer and producer. The film was nominated at the 12th Africa Movie Academy Awards for Best Film in an African Language. His directorial debut was Love Faces, which was released in January 2018. Usama has also appeared in films such as New Intentions, Pain of Lies, and Iron Love.

From 2018 to 2022, Usama served as chief content officer for Stream Afrique, a subscription-based streaming platform that offers online streaming of majorly African content.

Mukwaya produced the inaugural IKON Awards and returned as producer for the second and third editions in 2024 and 2025. The 2023 edition marked his first live television production credit. He has served as the Director of Operations at the Ikon Aspire Foundation since 2024.

Mukwaya is an executive member of Uganda Film Network and a 2019 recipient of the LéO Africa Institute's Young Emerging Leaders Project Fellowship. Mukwaya was nominated for the 2026 Forty Under 40 Africa Awards in the Music and Entertainment category.

== Early life and background ==
Born in Mulago Hospital, Kampala, Uganda, Mukwaya has ancestry from Ganda, Ankole, and Rwanda. He is the son of religious leader Abdullah Mukwaya and Aziidah Mariam. As of 24 April 2019, Abdullah serves as the Qadhi of Mbarara City.

After the death of his mother when he was 8, Mukwaya's aunt took him in; when she died too, Mukwaya had to move in with his father and later on with his grandfather. He has four siblings from his mother and numerous from his father.

=== Education ===
Usama started pre-education at Saidat Aisha Nursery School and later at Buraaq Infants School, then in Bwaise. After the death of his mother, he was then shifted to Victoria Christian School in Ndeeba and later went on to attend Linnet Primary School in Nabweru, Wakiso District, for his final primary school education. In 2002, Usama joined Shuhada'e Islamic Secondary School for his O-Level and achieved his Advanced Certificate of Education from Nyamitanga Secondary School, both schools in Mbarara.

In 2008, Mukwaya studied Cisco Career Certifications Networking, and LAN/WAN Management under the faculty of information technology at Makerere University. Usama holds a diploma in film directing from MNFPAC. He was reported in 2019 to be pursuing a Diploma in Business Administration at Cavendish University, where he was twice awarded as the Best Innovative Student.

== Career ==
=== Early work (2009–2014) ===
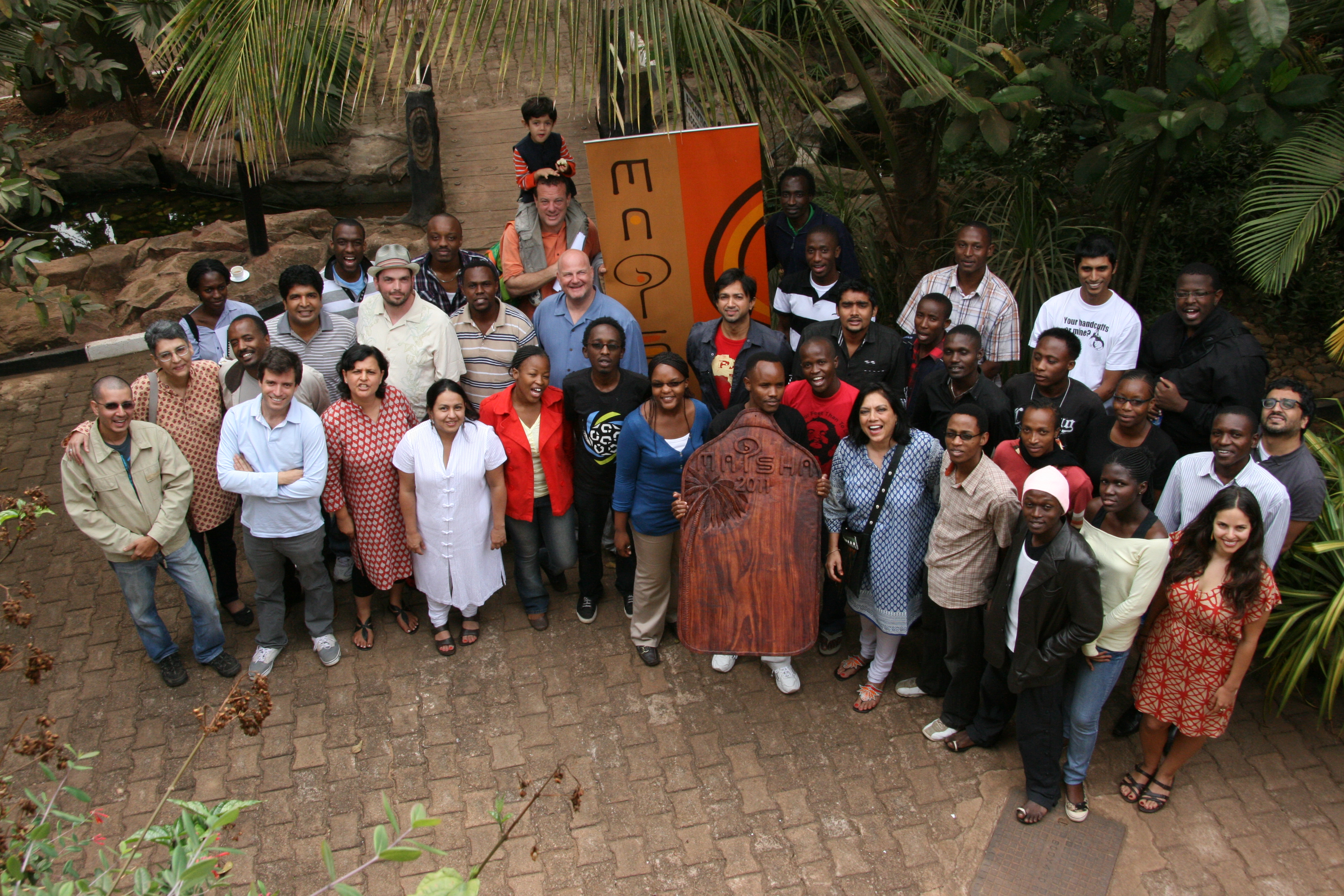
Mukwaya stands in front, first from right, with fellow 2011 Maisha participants and mentors. Third on the same row is lab founder and film director Mira Nair.

According to The Observer newspaper, Usama started his writing as a child. He made his film industry entry in 2009 through Dan Kiggundu's Maryland Productions, where he debuted as a script editor and supporting actor in the TV drama Pain of Lies, which premiered in 2011.

Through the Uganda Film Network, he later joined the Mariam Ndagire Film and Performing Arts Center, where he worked on his first short film, Hello, which won the overall best film at the 2010 MNFPAC Awards. In July 2011, he made it to the final selection of the 12 screenwriters from all over East Africa to participate in the 7th Maisha Film Lab, ending up with a collaboration with Diana Karua in the making of the short film She Likes Prada.

Kinna-Uganda (Ugandan film) has something to do with mediocrity. We should follow the trends of other industries like Hollywood, Bollywood, and Nollywood; let us call our industry Ugawood.

— Usama Mukwaya via The Observer

Amidst the other four young directors, he directed his first film, Smart Attempt, written by Julian Nabunya and Abel Mwesigwa, during the first season of the Movie Furnace program in August 2012. He went on to participate in the program's second season with his short film In Just Hours, emerging as the season's winner for best short film director.

He has worked as General Secretary and Treasurer of the Screenwriter's Guild of the Uganda Film Network and as General Secretary of the Pearl International Film Festival, of which he is also a founding member, before being appointed Festival Programmer for the 7th, 8th, and 9th editions consecutively.

In late 2011, Usama won the Young Achievers Award in the film and television category. He was the youngest among the recipients of the award in the newly introduced category, alongside Rwandan President Paul Kagame, who received the lifetime achievement award.

On 25 March 2012, Usama was quoted by The Observer alongside Ashraf Ssemwogerere in an interview about naming the growing film industry in Uganda, in which he stated that Ugawood could have been the appropriate name, citing that Kinna-Uganda had to do with mediocrity.

In July 2014, Mukwaya started his own film production company, O Studios Entertainment, based in Uganda, that immediately opened with the production of the short film, Tiktok, written and directed by himself. The studio has continued to produce various films including his directorial debut, Love Faces and The Passenger, among others.

=== Film breakthrough ===
==== (2014–2018): Bala Bala Sese, Rehema and Love Faces ====
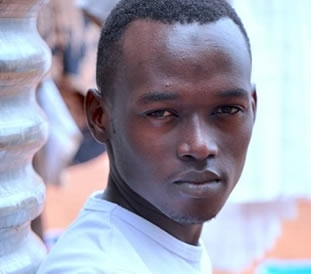
Usama in 2014

Immediately after Maisha Film Lab in 2011, Usama met video director Lukyamuzi Bashir of Badi Films and began working on Bala Bala Sese, marking his first feature film as a producer and writer. The film, which also doubles as Lukyamuzi's directory debut, was released on 3 July 2015, at the theater Labonita. It continued to top the best Ugandan films of 2015 and the following year.

It was nominated at the 12th Africa Movie Academy Awards for Best Film in an African Language. Bala Bala Sese also went on to feature in various international film festivals, including the Luxor African Film Festival in Egypt, where it held its African premiere and competed in the Long Narrative category with 13 other African films. It was the opening film at the 10th Amakula International Film Festival, automatically qualifying for the Golden Impala Award in the best African film category, which was won by De Noir. The film debuted its European release at the Helsinki African Film Festival in Finland. It features former celebrity couple Natasha Sinayobye and Michael Kasaija as on-screen lovers, first-time film actor and former The Ebonies member Raymond Rushabiro, and veteran stage actor Ashraf Ssemwogerere as the narrator and actor in the film.

After the release of Bala Bala Sese, Usama teamed up with Allan Manzi as a writer and producer to make the coming-of-age provocative short film Rehema. The film made its debut screening at the 38th Durban International Film Festival and also won best short film at the 2017 Uganda Film Festival

In 2018, after the first collaboration with Bobby Tamale on the silent short film Tiktok, Mukwaya and Bobby released Love Faces, Usama's feature directory debut, where he teamed up again with actors Laura Kahunde (Hello) and Patriq Nkakalukanyi (Tiktok), alongside first-timer Moses Kiboneka Jr. The film was a co-production between Tamz Production and Usama's O Studios Entertainment. Love Faces won best picture at the Viewers Choice Movie Awards and was nominated at the 2017 Uganda Film Festival for Best Costume Design and Production Design, 2018 Amakula International Film Festival for Best Feature Film among other nominations.

==== 2021 – present: The Passenger ====
The Blind Date marked the second collaboration between Usama and Loukman Ali after working together on the first season of Kyaddala TV Series, which was released in 2019. The Blind Date is the first of the three episodes meant to make an anthology of sorts. The short film features Martha Kay alongside Michael Wawuyo Jr. and Raymond Rushabiro, who stars as former army man – Jacob, alongside Riverdan Rugaaju, Patriq Nkakalukanyi, and Allen Musumba. It won Best Short film at the 2021 Uganda Film Festival. A follow-up episode titled Sixteen Rounds premiered on 16 September 2021. The 37-minute short features Michael Wawuyo Jr. again and Natasha Sinayobye in leading roles. It won best short film at the 43 Durban International Film Festival, Best short film at the 7th Mashariki African Film Festival and received a special mention at the 11 Luxor African Film Festival. Loukman announced in October 2021 that a feature film based on the Sixteen Round's story was in the making and Usama would be producing it, but it was later cancelled.

In 2023, Usama produced Nambi, an adaptation of a Ugandan folk tale called Kintu, written and directed by Peter Mikiibi and coproduced by Dennis Arthur Abwakat. The short film won the audience award at the 2023 Kortfilmfestival Kalmthout and was also nominated for the Best Short Film award at the 2023 Uganda Film Festival.

In the same year, Usama released The Passenger, his next feature film after Love Faces, which premiered on Maisha Magic Movies, a Dstv channel. Commissioned by Mnet, the film was directed by Hadijah Nakanjako, written by Meddy Sserwadda, and stars Henry Nathan Katongole, Allen Musumba, and Olot Bonny Elem in leading roles. The film received 11 nominations at the Uganda Film Festival 2023 and won five awards. It was also nominated twice at the 2024 Africa Magic Viewers' Choice Awards. Mukwaya served as executive producer through O Studios Entertainment.

=== Mentorship and industry development ===
Mukwaya has served as a mentor for film training and fellowship programmes, including the IKON Fellowship Program, where he has mentored participants in film budgeting and production planning since its inception in 2022. In 2026, he was selected as a budgeting mentor for the Script to Market International Residency, a 14-week film development programme in Uganda.

== Television ==
In July 2013, Mukwaya made his television hosting debut on the second season of the Movie Digest Show on Record TV Network Uganda, with actress Monica Birwinyo replacing pioneer host and former Tusker Project Fame 3 contestant Jacob Nsaali. Previously, Mukwaya had worked on the show as a producer.

=== Television series ===
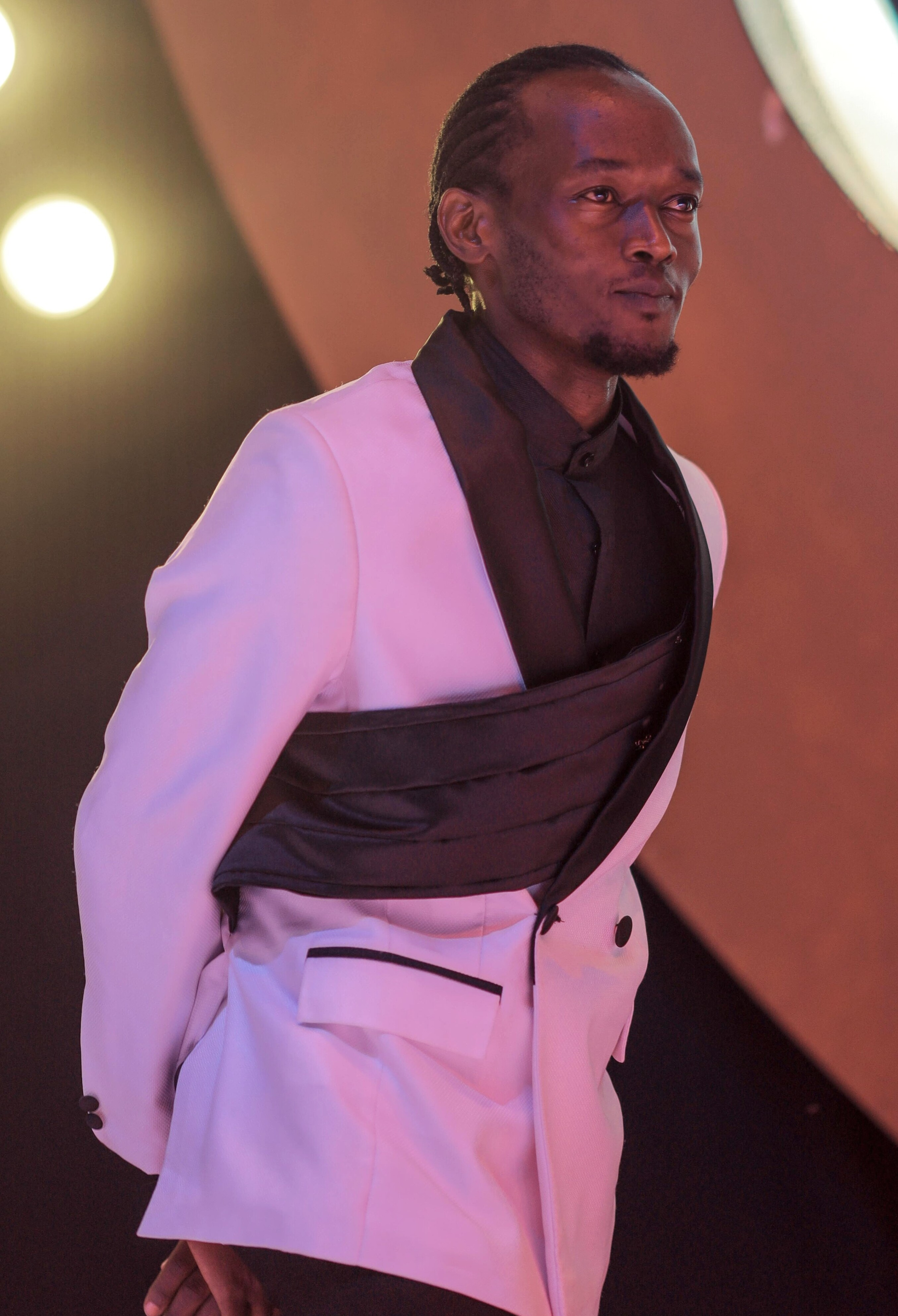
Usama in 2023 presenting the "In Memoriam" segment the iKON Awards

In mid-2018, Usama joined the production of Reach a Hand Uganda's television drama Kyaddala as a producer, his debut television drama series, with Humphrey Nabimanya as executive producer and Emmanuel Ikubese as the show's creator.

The series, set in present-day high school life, focuses on real-life social issues that affect young people in Africa and stars actors from Nigeria, Kenya, and Uganda. It was announced in October 2020 that the series would be renewed for the second season, with Usama returning as producer and in talks to direct as well. Kyaddala Season 2 premiered again on NBS TV on 4 March 2022, with Usama producing and directing the entire season.

In July 2020, Usama joined the production of the first season of MultiChoice Uganda' original TV series, Sanyu. The series premiered on DStv Uganda's Pearl Magic Prime on 8 February 2021, at the official launch of the channel. Usama later joined the production of another DStv television series, Damalie, serving as producer. The two-season series premiered on 30 September 2024, and aired until 26 November 2025.

=== Television specials ===
On 18 October 2022, Usama was named as the producer of the inaugural edition of The iKON Awards: Film and Television which happened on 25 March 2023. This marked his first "live" television production credit for a major show. The awards are meant to recognize and reward personalities in the Ugandan film and television industry. He returned as the show producer again on the second edition in 2024 and the 3rd edition in 2025.

== Philanthropy ==
Mukwaya began his philanthropic work in January 2015 with Empowerment of Disadvantaged Youth and Children (EDYAC) when he traveled to Tororo in eastern Uganda to share life experiences. He and Bobby Tamale, with whom they had previously worked, later made a documentary, which is now available on YouTube, about their experience with the video directed and narrated by Mukwaya.

=== Usama Mukwaya Scholarship ===
The Usama Mukwaya Scholarship is an annual merit-based scholarship offered by Usama to support outstanding, collaborative, rising Ugandan creatives in an innovative one-year film and theatre experience. It is administered by Marisul, a non profit organization founded by Usama himself. The inaugural scholarship was awarded in May 2021 to Kizito Ismael after winning best theatre production at the Mariam Ndagire Film and Performing Arts Center, Class of 2021. As of 2025, a total of four scholarships have been awarded.

== Personal life ==
Usama is the son of religious leader Abdullah Mukwaya and currently lives in Kampala.

== Awards and nominations ==
Usama has received numerous awards and nominations, including a nomination at the 12th Africa Movie Academy Awards for Best Film in an African Language Film for his film Bala Bala Sese. His 2021 short film Sixteen Rounds won best short film at the 43 Durban International Film Festival and 7th Mashariki African Film Festival, and received a nomination at the 2023 Africa Magic Viewers' Choice Awards. He also received two nominations for Best Scripted M-Net Original and Best M-Net Original at the 2024 Africa Magic Viewers' Choice Awards for the film The Passenger.

== Filmography ==
Key
| † | Denotes works that have not yet been released |

=== Film ===
| Year | Title | Credited as | | | Notes |
| Year | Title | Director | Producer | Writer | Notes |
|---|---|---|---|---|---|
| TBA | Untitled Philly Lutaaya Biopic† | Yes | Yes | with Nickson Kamau | |
| TBA | In Just Hours† | Yes | Executive | Yes | |
| TBA | Ndagire† | No | Executive | with Meddy Sserwadda | |
| 2027 | Nsangi† | No | Executive | No | |
| 2025 | Call 112 | Yes | with Hadijah Nakanjako | with Meddy Sserwadda | |
| 2023 | Nambi | No | with Dennis Arthur Abwakat | No | Also Casting Director |
| 2023 | The Passenger | No | Executive | Story | |
| 2021 | Sixteen Rounds | No | with Loukman Ali | No | Sequel to "The Blind Date" |
| 2021 | The Blind Date | No | Executive | No | |
| 2017 | Love Faces | Yes | with Bobby Tamale | Yes | Directorial debut |
| 2017 | Rehema | No | with Allan Manzi | Yes | |
| 2015 | Bala Bala Sese | No | Yes | Yes | |
| 2015 | Tiktok | Yes | No | Yes | |
| 2013 | In Just Hours | Yes | No | Yes | |
| 2012 | Smart Attempt | Yes | No | No | |
| 2010 | Hello | No | No | Yes | Also credited as First assistant director |

=== Television ===
| Year | Title | Credited as | | | | Notes |
| Year | Title | Writer | Director | Producer | Executive Producer | Notes |
|---|---|---|---|---|---|---|
| 2026 | Kavule Town | Creator | No | No | Yes | Television series |
| 2023 - 2025 | iKON Awards | No | No | Yes | No | Television special |
| 2023 - 2025 | Damalie | No | No | Yes | No | Television series |
| 2021 - 2024 | Sanyu | No | No | Line Producer | No | Television series |
| 2019 - 2022 | Kyaddala | No | Season 2 | Yes | No | Television series |
| 2012 - 2013 | Movie Digest Show | No | No | Also Host for 2013 Season | No | Television programme |

=== Acting credits ===
| Year | Title | Role |
|---|---|---|
| TBA | In Just Hours† | |
| 2016 | New Intentions | Bruno |
| 2011 | Pain Of Lies | Osama |
| 2010 | Iron Love | Student |

=== Documentary ===
| Year | Documentary | Role | | | Notes |
| Year | Documentary | Director | Writer | Producer | Notes |
|---|---|---|---|---|---|
| 2015 | Tales from Edyac | Yes | Yes | Yes | |

=== Commercials ===
| Year | Advertisement | Role | | | | Notes |
| Year | Advertisement | Actor | Director | Writer | Producer | Notes |
|---|---|---|---|---|---|---|
| 2021 | Closer Together | | | | Yes | GOtv Africa |

== Frequent collaborators ==
| Artist | Hello (2011) | Bala Bala Sese (2015) | Tiktok (2015) | Rehema (2016) | Love Faces (2017) | Kyaddala (2019 - 2022) | The Blind Date (2021) | Sixteen Rounds (2021) | The Passenger (2023) | Call 112 (2025) |
|---|---|---|---|---|---|---|---|---|---|---|
| Alex Ireeta | | ✔ | ✔ | ✔ | ✔ | ✔ | | | | ✔ |
| Raymond Rushabiro | | ✔ | | ✔ | ✔ | ✔ | ✔ | ✔ | | |
| Hadijah Nakanjako | | | | ✔ | ✔ | ✔ | | | ✔ | ✔ |
| Laura Kahunde | ✔ | | | | ✔ | ✔ | | | | |
| Loukman Ali | | | | | | ✔ | ✔ | ✔ | | |
| Michael Wawuyo Jr. | | | | | ✔ | | ✔ | ✔ | | |
