= Peter Odeke =

Ugandan actor (born 1970)

- Born: 21 November 1970 (age 55); Kampala, Uganda
- Occupations: Actor, radio presenter
- Years active: 2002–present

Peter Paul Odeke (born 21 November 1970) is a Ugandan actor, radio presenter and voice artist. He first appeared on a national stage in the early 1990s with SPECTRUM, a contemporary dance-drama group that followed in the infamous style of the Namasagali College’s productions.

== Early life and education ==
Odeke was born in Kampala, Uganda and is of Teso descent, and is the fourth of six children.

He was widely exposed to extra-curricular activities while at Kitante Primary School and was quite active in athletics and drama. In his secondary school years at St. Mary's College Kisubi, he was renowned for his robotic moves and break-dancing skills.

He joined the regional start-up airline Alliance Air (SA Alliance Air) as a flight attendant, rising to become purser within three years.

== Career ==
=== Stage ===
Odeke's first experience with the National Theatre came in the early 1990s with the contemporary dance-drama group SPECTRUM. He acted as Teezi in the group's most successful production, Unleashed Fury, before taking a sojourn because of his university study.

=== Television ===
Odeke made his debut in television drama in 2002 with the highly acclaimed Centre 4, a thirteen-episode health TV drama in which he played the lead role of Moses Wema, a mysterious laboratory technician.

He currently features as "Judge Isaac Jemba" in Junior Drama Club, a family drama screening on DSTV's Pearl Magic Prime channel.

=== Radio drama ===
Odeke has also ventured into radio drama in two BBC African radio plays: Kitu Kidogo (by Kenneth Atwiine) and Damn Seconds (by Pamela Otali).

=== Film ===
In 2004, Odeke landed his first movie role in Raoul Peck's HBO movie, Sometimes in April, featuring Idris Elba.

Back in Kampala, he played Denis Obua in Dan Gordon's BBC docu-drama The John Akii-Bua Story: An African Tragedy (2008). His first local film project was with renowned Ugandan director Matt Bish; he had a supporting role in the award-winning movie S.R.B (2010) as Julius Dracu.

Odeke was in the 2016 Walt Disney Pictures production Queen of Katwe, starring Academy Award-winning actress Lupita Nyong'o and David Oyelowo. Odeke plays Mr. Barumba, the chairperson of the Chess Federation in Uganda.

Odeke's most recent project is the film Janani: The Last Stand, a Matt Bish project based on the final days of Archbishop Janani Luwum, who was murdered during the reign of President Idi Amin of Uganda. Odeke plays the lead role of Luwum.

== Personal life ==
Odeke has three boys: Nkosi, Kwame and Diallo. He has been married to Christine since 30 November 2007.

Odeke currently works in the Parliament of Uganda.

== Performances ==
=== Film ===
Year	Title	Role	Director	Notes
2005	Sometimes in April	Militia Man #2	Raoul Peck	TV movie
2007	Ezra	Snake Savimbi	Newton I. Aduaka	Feature film
2007	Shake Hands with the Devil	Ghanaian Lieutenant	Roger Spottiswoode	Feature film
2008	The John Akii Bua Story: An African Tragedy	Denis Obua	Daniel Gordon	Documentary
2010	State Research Bureau	Julius Dracu	Matt Bish	Feature film
2016	Queen of Katwe	Enoch Barumba	Mira Nair	Feature
2022	Kafa Coh	Tereke Stephens	Gilbert K. Lukalia	Feature
2025	Call 112	Goliath Ndyanabo	Usama Mukwaya	Short film

=== Radio ===
Year	Title	Role	Notes
2012	Kitu Kidogo		
2012	Damn Seconds		
