= Tendo Sisters =

Ugandan television series

- Genre: Drama series
- Written by: Mariam Ndagire
- Directed by: Mariam Ndagire
- Starring: Mariam Ndagire; Farida Nabagereka; Sarah Naava; Jamila Mulindwa; Annet Nandujja
- Country of origin: Uganda
- Original languages: English; Luganda
- No. of seasons: 3

Production
- Executive producer: Mariam Ndagire
- Producer: Mariam Ndagire
- Production location: Uganda

Original release
- Network: NTV Uganda (2009-2012); Bekedde TV1 (2012-2014)
- Release: 2009 – 2014

Tendo Sisters is a Ugandan drama television series about four orphaned sisters who are left with only a piece of land as their inheritance and the rifts that grow between them as they start a new life without their parents. The series was written, produced and directed by Mariam Ndagire and stars Ndagire, Farida Nabagereka, Sarah Naava, Jamila Mulindwa as the four sisters Kisaakye, Mukisa, Sanyu and Malaika respectively and Annet Nandujja who plays their auntie, Nattendo.

The series premiered on NTV Uganda in December 2009 and ran for three seasons until 2012. The series was then picked up by Bukedde TV1 in 2012 and ran until 2014. Repeats of the series continued being aired until 2017.

== Cast ==
- Mariam Ndagire - Kisaakye
- Faridah Nabagereka - Mukisa
- Sarah Naava - Sanyu
- Jamila Mulindwa - Malaika
- Annet Nandujja - Nattendo

== Awards and nominations ==
Awards & Nominations
Year	Award	Category	Received by	Result	Ref
2014	The Radio and Television Academy Awards (RTV Awards)	Best Local TV Drama	Mariam Ndagire	Nominated	

== Theatre Adaptation ==
In 2013, a theatre play adaptation of the series was staged at Bat Valley Theater in Kampala due to the popularity of the show among theatre goers. The second season titled Chapter 2 was staged in 2014.
