= Hello (2011 film) =

- Film poster
- Directed by: John Martyn Ntabazi
- Written by: Usama Mukwaya
- Produced by: Mariam Ndagire
- Starring: Laura Kahunde, John Martyn Ntabazi, Katushabe Siam
- Cinematography: Doson Mukwaya
- Edited by: Iryn Priscila Mulindwa
- Production companies: Trendz Studios, MNFPAC
- Release date: November 30, 2011 (Pearl)
- Running time: 11 minutes
- Country: Uganda
- Language: Luganda

Hello is a Ugandan drama short film directed by John Martyn Ntabazi and written by Usama Mukwaya. The movie was made under the MNFPAC workshop and won the overall best short film. It debuted its screening at the 2011 Pearl International Film Festival. It is Usama's first screenplay.

== Plot ==
The invasive development of phone technology is throwing one husband and wife off balance. When Kakumba finds his wife engrossed in a 'romantic' conversation on the phone with some unknown correspondent, he immediately suspects that his wife is cheating on him.

== Cast ==
- Laura Kahunde as Rehema
- John Martyn Ntabazi
- Katushabe Siam
