= 3rd Pearl International Film Festival =

Film frstival

The 3rd Pearl International Film Festival took place in Kampala, Uganda from 13 to 16 May 2013. King's Virgin won Best Picture. Film director Prince Joe Nakibinge was awarded the best director prize. Film director Matt Bish was the festival chief jury. He was previously the winner of best film at the 2nd edition in 2012. The festival also had special screenings of two African films, Nairobi Half Life and Nina's Dowry that initially vied for the Best Foreign Film award that was later removed from the categories.

== Awards ==
The following awards were presented at the 3rd edition:

Best Editing

- Kayongo Ivan Kavan (Semester)

Best Supporting Actor

- Mageye Hassan (King's Virgins)

Best Supporting Actress

- Abha Kalsi (Hang Out)

Best Script /Writer

- Nakulima Jennifer (Omugugu gw’ekibi)

Best Sound

- King’s Virgins

Best Cinematography

- Kayongo Ivan Kavan (Semester)

Best Production Design

- Wasajja Joshua (King's Virgins)

Best Short Film

- E’nda The Suicide Note

Best Short Film Documentary

- Defying the Odds

Best Media House

- Vision Group

Media Personality

- Polly Kamukama

Special Award

- Hussein Kagolo

Best Actress in a lead

- Nakulima Jennifer (Omugugu gw’ekibi)

Best Actor in a lead

- Bijampora Herbert (E’nda The Suicide Note)

Best Director

- Prince Joe Nakibinge (King's Virgins)

Best Feature Film

- King’s Virgins
