= Movie Digest Show =

Ugandan movie review television program

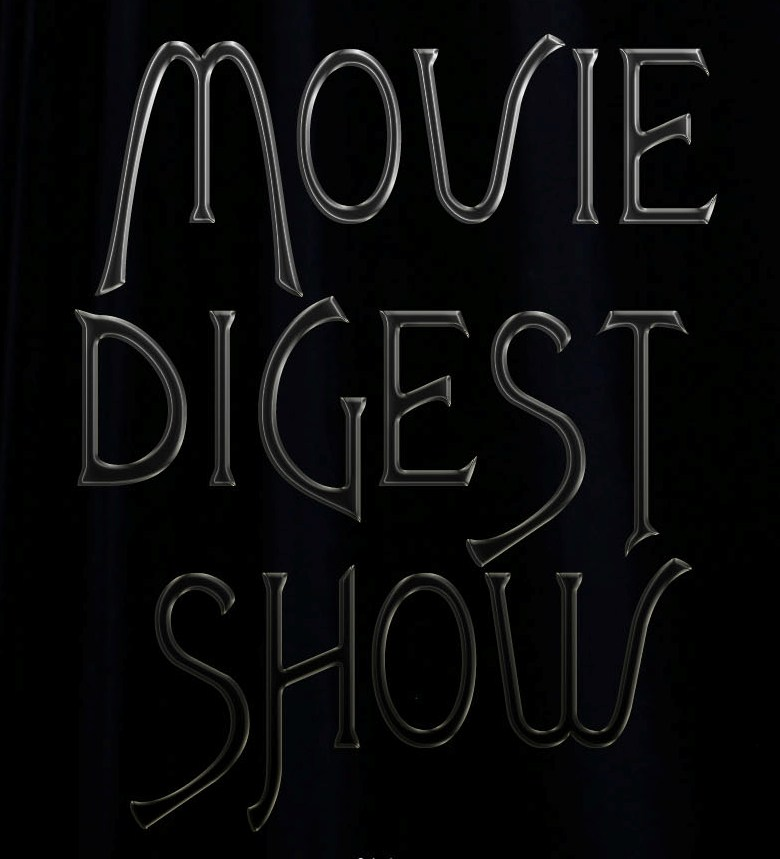
- Movie Digest Show logo
- Created by: Moses Magezi
- Presented by: Usama Mukwaya; Monica Birwinyo; Hadijah Nakanjako; Irene Asumpta; Cynthia Kukunda
- Country of origin: Uganda

Production
- Production locations: Kampala, Uganda
- Running time: 30 minutes

Original release
- Network: Record TV Network
- Release: April 4, 2012 – January 21, 2014

Movie Digest Show was Uganda's first movie review television program that aired every Tuesday at 8:30 pm. The first season of the program originally aired on Record TV Network. The second premiered July 2013.

== Hosts ==
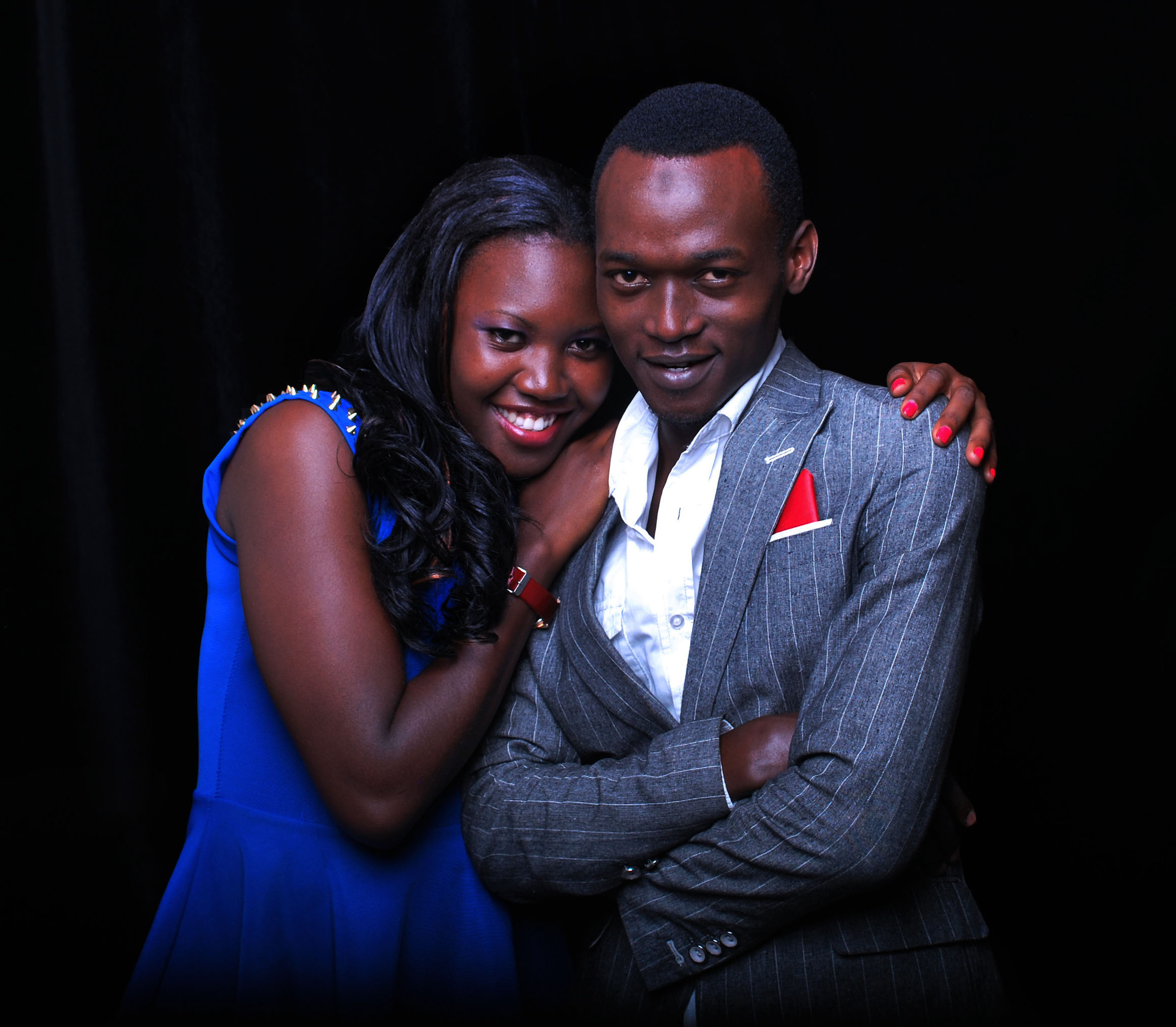
Movie Digest Show 2013 cover with Monica and Usama.

Actresses Monica Birwinyo and Irene Asumpta and former Tusker Project Fame 3 contestant Jacob Nsaali were the original hosts of the show from March 4, 2012 until December 10, 2012 on Record TV. It was announced that screenwriter and film director Usama Mukwaya would replace Jacob in May 2013 with the second season airing soon.

== See also ==
- Hand in Hand (Ugandan TV series)
- Beneath The Lies - The Series
