= Scars of My Days =

- Directed by: Gilbert Ndahayo
- Produced by: Eric Kabera
- Release date: 2006
- Running time: 30 mins

Scars Of My Days is a 2006 short film. It was produced in collaboration with the Swedish Institute and aired on TV5Monde.

== Awards ==
- First Time Director's Golden Impala at Amakula Film Festival, 2006

== Festivals ==
- Tribeca Film Festival, New York, 2007
