= Bobby Tamale =

Ugandan actor (born 1984)

- Born: Robert Tamale; 28 August 1984 (age 41)
- Occupation: actor
- Notable work: The Only Son

Robert Tamale, known popularly as Bobby Tamale, is a Ugandan film actor and producer.

== Career ==
He broke through his acting career through It Can't Be, a TV drama airing on WBS TV. In the 2016 Ugandan film The Only Son, he starred as Davis in his first lead role as well as serving as executive producer. The film was nominated in six categories at the 2016 Uganda Film Festival, including Best Screenplay, Best Sound, Best Editing, Film of the Year, Best Lead Actor and Best Feature Film. Tamale was also an executive producer for Tiktok and Love Faces (film), both directed by Usama Mukwaya.
