= 2024 Africa Magic Viewers' Choice Awards =

10th Africa Magic Viewers' Choice Awards
- Date: 11 May 2024

Highlights
- Most nominations: Over the Bridge

The 2024 Africa Magic Viewers' Choice Awards was held on 11 May 2024, at Eko Hotels and Suites, Lagos State. The nominees were revealed on 24 March 2024, and the most nominations went to Over the Bridge with 12 nominations including Best Supporting Actor and Actress, Best Lead Actress, Best Cinematography, Best Editing, Best Sound Design, Best Art Direction, Best Make Up, Best Costume Design, Best Writing in a Movie, Best Director and Best Movie. This was followed by Mami Wata with 11 nominations and Breath of Life and Jagun Jagun with 10 nominations each.

== Awards ==
Winners are listed highlighted in boldface.

Best Lead Actress	Best Lead Actor
**Kehinde Bankole** **(Adire)**; Segilola Ogidan (Over The Bridge); Lucie Debay (Omen); Omowunmi Dada (Asiri Ade); Ireti Doyle (The Origin: Madam Koi Koi); Adaobi Dibor (Blood Vessel); Evelyne Ily (Mami Wata); Funke Akindele (A Tribe Called Judah)	**Wale Ojo** **(Breath of Life)**; Stan Nze (Afamefuna); Marc Zinga (Omen); Gideon Okeke (Egun); David Ezekiel (Blood Vessel); Richard Mofe Damijo (The Black Book); Adedimeji Lateef (Jagun Jagun – The Warrior); Gabriel Afolayan (This is Lagos)
Best Supporting Actress	Best Supporting Actor
**Genoveva Umeh** **(Breath of Life)**; Joke Silva (Over the Bridge); Fathia Williams (Jagun Jagun – The Warrior) Brown; Bimbo Akintola (The Black Book; Eliane Umuhire (Omen); Tana Adelana (Ijogbon – Chaos); Ejiro Onojaife (The Origin: Madam Koi Koi)	**Demola Adedoyin** **(Breath of Life)**; Alexx Ekubo (Afamefuna); Ibrahim Yekini (Jagun Jagun: The Warrior); Gregory Ojefua (This is Life); Timini Egbuson (A Tribe Called Judah); Levi Chikere (Blood Vessel); Ropo Ewenla (Over the Bridge)
Best Indigenous Language – West Africa	Best Indigenous Language – East Africa
**Jagun Jagun** **(Femi Adebayo)**; Mami Wata (CJ Fiery Obasi); Ijogbon (Kunle Afolayan); Orisa (Odunlade Adekola); Nana Akoto (Kwabena Gyansah)	**Ormoilaa Ogol (The Strong One)**; Where The River Divides; Wandongwa; Nakupenda; Itifaki
Best Indigenous Language – South Africa	Best Art Director
**Motshameko O Kotsi**; Service To Heart; Uncle Limbani	**Over The Bridge** **(Abisola Omolade)**; Blood Vessel (Victor Akpan); Breath of Life (Okechukwu Frost Nwankwo, Kelechi Odu); The Black Book (Pat Nebo and Chima Temple); Jagun Jagun: The Warrior (Tunji Afolayan); Mami Wata (C.J Fiery Obasi); Omen (Eve Martin)
Best Costume Design	Best Picture Editor
**Jagun Jagun** **(Lola Awe)**; Over The Bridge – Demola Adeyemi; Fumilayo Ransome – Kuti (Bolanle Austen- Peters, Ituen Basi, Folake Coker, Clement Effanga); Mami Wata (Bunmi Demilola Fashina); Breathe of Life (Daniel Obasi)	**Antonio Ribeiro (The Black Book)**; Chuka Ejorh And Onyekachi Banjo; Holmes Awa; Alex Kamau And Victor Obok; Dayo Nathaniel; Nathan Delannoy
Best Sound Design	Best Make Up
**Grey Jones Ossai and Fisayo Adefolaju** – **Blood Vessel**; Ava Momoh (Over the Bridge); Daniel Pellerin and Amin Bhatia (Kipkemboi); Grey Jones Ossai, Kaline, Fisayo Adefolaju (Breath of Life); Samy Bardet (Mami Wata)	**Mami Wata** **(Campbell Precious Arebamen)**; Over The Bridge (Francesca Otaigbe); Mojisola (Hadizat Gambo); Jagun Jagun (Hakeem Onilogbo); A Tribe Called Judah (Feyisayo Oyebisi)
Best Writing – TV Series	Best Writing – Movie
**Volume -** **Mona Ombogo**; Skinny Girls in Transit (s7) - Bunmi Ajakaiye, Ifeanyi Barbara Chidi and Abdul Tijani- Ahmed; Wura (s2) - Jeffery David Musa, Olumide Kuti and Esther Oyiza Kokori; Visa On Arrival - Bovi Ugboma; MTV Shuga Naija - The MTV Staying Alive Foundation; Masquerades of Aniedo - Timendo Aghahowa and Motunde Akiode; Slum King - Donald Tombia, Ifeanyi Barbara Chidi, Fatimah Binta Gimsay and Xavier Ighordje	**Funmilayo Ransome-Kuti** – **Tunde Babalola**; Breath of Life – BB Sasore'; Over The Bridge – Tosin Otudeko; Jagun Jagun – Adebayo Tijani; Afamefuna – Anyanwu Sandra Adaora; ATCJ – Funke Ayotunde Akindele, Collins Okoh & Akinlabi Ishola; Mami Wata – CJ Obasi
Best Short Film	Best Cinematography
**Broken Mask**; T'egbon T'aburo; Eighteenth Year; Man and Masquerades; A Place Called Forward	**Over The Bridge**; Mami Wata; Blood Vessel; Breath of Life; Jagun Jagun (The Warrior); Ijogbon (Chaos); Omen
Best Movie	Best Multichoice Talent Factory Movie
Funmilayo Ransome-Kuti; **Breath of Life**; Over The Bridge; Blood Vessel; A Tribe Called Judah; The Black Book; Mami Wata	Grown; **Her Dark Past**; Somewhere in Kole; Full Time Husband; The 11th Commandment; Mfumukazi
Best Director	Best Documentary
Moses Inwang (Blood Vessel); Adebayo Tijani & Tope Adebayo (Jagun Jagun); **BB Sasore** **(Breath of Life)**; Johnscott Enah (Half Heaven); C. J. Fiery Obasi (Mami Wata); Kayode Kasum (Afamefuna); Tolu Ajayi (Over The Bridge)	Ormoilaa Ogol (The Strong One); **Lobola – A Bride’s True Price?**; Empalikino (Forgiveness); The Water Manifesto: Osun (Water For Gold); Sowing Hope
Best Digital Content	Best Scripted M-Net Original
National Treasure – Adebola Adeyela (Lizzy Jay); **Medical Negligence and Copyright Infringement** – **Isaac Ayomide Olayiwola (Layi Wasabi)**; Hello Neighbour – Elozonam Ogbolu, Lina idoko and Jemima Osunde; The Boyfriend – Maryam Apaokagi-Greene	**Slum King**; Half Open Window; Itura; The Passenger – Usama Mukwaya, Meddy Sserwadda, Hadijah Nakanjako; Magic Room
Best Indigenous M-Net Original	Best Unscripted M-Net Original
The Passenger – Usama Mukwaya, Meddy Sserwadda, Hadijah Nakanjako; Nana Akoto; Apo; **Irora Iya**; Love Transfusion (Kiapo Cha Damu)	What Will People Say; The Irabors’ Forever After; '**Nwuyee Bekee (Foreign Wives)**; Date My Family Zambia; Royal Qlique (Season 2)
Best Series (Unscripted)	Best Series (Scripted)
LOL Naija (s1); Nightlife in Lasgidi; The Real Housewives of Lagos; **Gh Queens** **(s2)**; Mutale Mwanza Unscripted (s1)	Volume; Wura (s2); Slum King; **Itura**; Chronicles
Trailblazer Award	Industry Merit Award
**Chimezie Imo**	**Idowu Philips** **(Iya Rainbow)**; **Richard Mofe Damijo**
