= Blood Vessel (2023 film) =

Nigerian thriller film

- Directed by: Moses Inwang
- Release date: 2023
- Country: Nigeria

Blood Vessel is a Nigerian drama thriller film directed by Moses Inwang, and produced by Charles Okpaleke, Arafat Bello-Osagie, Roxanne Adekunle-Wright, and Agozie Ugwu. The film stars Dibor Adaobi and David Ezekiel as the main protagonists with Swanky JKA, Levi Chikere, Obinna Okenwa, and Sylvester Ekanem as supporting characters. The film was released to Netflix on December 8, 2023, to popular reception, maintaining its position on the Top 10 list for two consecutive weeks. The film is the first Netflix film to use the Ijaw language extensively in its dialogue, and include an Ijaw language subtitle option as well.

== Synopsis ==
Set against the backdrop of the Niger Delta oil conflict, six young people fleeing a town devastated by oil pollution and political unrest stow away on a ship laden with stolen crude oil and embark on a perilous journey across the Atlantic Ocean—not realizing the dangers that await. Trapped for days in a small hold, they eventually come face to face with a cruel Russian rogue captain and his men. As more and more of them are killed or tortured, the youngest of them, Abbey, manages to get out and fight to make it out alive.

== Cast ==
- Dibor Adaobi as Oyinbrakemi
- David Ezekiel as Abbey
- Swanky JKA as Boma
- Levi Chikere as Degbe
- Obinna Okenwa as Olotu
- Sylvester Ekanem as Tekena
- Emmanuel Abanobi as Oyin's cousin
- Victor Akpan as Commander Kome
- Katerine Ataman as Anya
- Francis Duru as Pere
- Alexis Ebi as Bibi
- Pere Egbi as Captain Qudus
- Ovunda Ihunwo as Ogola
- Abraham Jehu as Bemeyi
- Bimbo Manuel as Ebiye
- Ebele Okaro-Onyiuke as Ebi
- Isioma Owere as Funembi
- Joy Success as Tamara
- Haillie Sumney as Tessi
- Norbert Young as Gesiye
- John Dumelo as Commander John
- Alex Budin as Igor
- Timi Clement as Larry

== Release ==
Blood Vessel was released on Netflix on December 8, 2023, and became the most-watched film in the Non-English Film category by garnering 4.4 million views between December 11 and 17. The film had 8.8 million viewing watch hours, maintaining its position on the top 10 list for two consecutive weeks.

== Awards ==
At the 2024 Africa Magic Viewers' Choice Awards, Blood Vessel won Best Sound Design for Gray Jones Ossai and Fisayo Adefolaju.
