= The Passenger (2023 Ugandan film) =

- Directed by: Hadijah Nakanjako
- Written by: Meddy Sserwadda
- Produced by: Usama Mukwaya; Meddy Sserwadda; Hadijah Nakanjako
- Starring: Henry Nathan Katongole; Allen Musumba; Olot Bonny Elem
- Cinematography: Izeak Ekuka
- Edited by: Daka Waira Emmanuel
- Music by: Isiko Abubaker
- Production company: O Studios Entertainment
- Distributed by: M-Net
- Release date: January 21, 2023
- Running time: 73 minutes
- Country: Uganda
- Languages: Luganda, English

The Passenger is a 2023 Ugandan film directed by Hadijah Nakanjako and written by Meddy Sserwadda. The film stars Henry Nathan Katongole, Allen Musumba and Olot Bonny Elem in leading roles. Usama Mukwaya serves as the executive producer through O Studios Entertainment.

The film is a commission project by Maisha Magic Movies and its Hadijah's feature film directorial debut.

== Plot ==
A young man tries to deliver a mysterious package to the city on a bus but another passenger thinks he is a killer carrying a mutilated body or bomb and is determined to stop him.

== Cast ==
- Henry Nathan Katongole as Musa Kibalama
- Allen Musumba as Regina Nabatanzi
- Olot Bonny Elem as Okello Wilbur
- Kawuma Fred as Conductor
- Irene Munyenga as Nabatanzi Neighbor
- Nyamatte Mariam as Annet
- Emily Yomcwiny as Winnie

== Release ==
The film was released digitally by MultiChoice on Maisha Magic Movies January 21, 2023. The film was listed among the top films of 2023 by Africa International Film Festival.

== Nominations and awards ==
The film received 11 nominations at the Uganda Film Festival 2023 and later won 5 awards.

Awards & Nominations
Year	Award	Category	Received by	Result	Ref
2023	Uganda Film Festival Awards(UFF)	Best Feature Film	Usama Mukwaya, Meddy Sserwadda, Hadijah Nakanjako	Nominated	
2023	Uganda Film Festival Awards(UFF)	Best Indigenous Film	Usama Mukwaya, Meddy Sserwadda, Hadijah Nakanjako	Won	
2023	Uganda Film Festival Awards(UFF)	Best Director	Hadijah Nakanjako	Nominated	
2023	Uganda Film Festival Awards(UFF)	Best Actor (Film)	Henry Nathan Katongole	Won	
2023	Uganda Film Festival Awards(UFF)	People's Choice Award	Usama Mukwaya, Meddy Sserwadda, Hadijah Nakanjako	Nominated	
2023	Uganda Film Festival Awards(UFF)	Best Supporting Actress	Allen Musumba	Nominated	
2023	Uganda Film Festival Awards(UFF)	Best Production Design	Imran Musabeh	Nominated	
2023	Uganda Film Festival Awards(UFF)	Best Sound	Isiko Abubaker	Won	
2023	Uganda Film Festival Awards(UFF)	Best Editing & Post Production	Daka Emmanuel Waira	Won	
2023	Uganda Film Festival Awards(UFF)	Best Cinematography	Izeak Ekuka	Won	
2023	Uganda Film Festival Awards(UFF)	Best Script (Screen Play)	Meddy Sserwadda	Nominated	
2023	Pearl International Film Festival(PIFF)	Best Feature Film	Usama Mukwaya, Meddy Sserwadda, Hadijah Nakanjako	Nominated	
2023	Pearl International Film Festival(PIFF)	Best Director	Hadijah Nakanjako	Nominated	
2023	Pearl International Film Festival(PIFF)	Best Actor	Henry Nathan Katongole	Won	
2023	Pearl International Film Festival(PIFF)	Best Supporting Actress	Allen Musumba	Nominated	
2023	Pearl International Film Festival(PIFF)	Best Production Design	Imran Musabeh	Nominated	
2023	Pearl International Film Festival(PIFF)	Best Editing	Daka Emmanuel Waira	Nominated	
2023	Pearl International Film Festival(PIFF)	Best Cinematography	Izeak Ekuka	Won	
2023	Pearl International Film Festival(PIFF)	Best Costume	Nantege Joan	Nominated	
2023	Mashariki African Film Festival	Long Feature Fiction	Usama Mukwaya, Meddy Sserwadda, Hadijah Nakanjako	Nominated	
2023	Malawi International Film Festival	Best International Feature Film	Usama Mukwaya, Meddy Sserwadda, Hadijah Nakanjako	Won	
2023	Malawi International Film Festival	Best International Film director	Hadijah Nakanjako	Won	
2024	2nd iKON Awards	Best Film	Meddy Sserwadda, Hadijah Nakanjako	Nominated	
2024	2nd iKON Awards	Best Director	Hadijah Nakanjako	Nominated	
2024	2nd iKON Awards	Best Actor	Henry Nathan Katongole	Won	
2024	2nd iKON Awards	Best Supporting Actress	Allen Musumba	Won	
2024	2nd iKON Awards	Best Production Design	Imran Musabeh	Nominated	
2024	2nd iKON Awards	Best Sound	Isiko Abubaker	Nominated	
2024	2nd iKON Awards	Best Editing	Daka Emmanuel Waira	Won	
2024	2nd iKON Awards	Best Cinematography	Izeak Ekuka	Won	
2024	2nd iKON Awards	Best Script (Screen Play)	Meddy Sserwadda	Nominated	
2024	2024 Africa Magic Viewers' Choice Awards	Best Indigenous M-Net Original	Usama Mukwaya, Meddy Sserwadda, Hadijah Nakanjako	Nominated	
2024	2024 Africa Magic Viewers' Choice Awards	Best Scripted M-Net Original	Usama Mukwaya, Meddy Sserwadda, Hadijah Nakanjako	Nominated	
2024	New Vision Peoples Choice Film Awards	Best Cinematography Feature Film	Izeak Ekuka	Nominated	
2024	New Vision Peoples Choice Film Awards	Best Costume Design Feature Film	Joan Nantege	Nominated	
2024	New Vision Peoples Choice Film Awards	Best Screenplay Feature Film	Meddy Sserwadda	Nominated	
2024	New Vision Peoples Choice Film Awards	Best Make Up Feature Film	Joan Nantege	Nominated	
2025	Kitale Film Week Awards	Best Screenplay	Meddy Sserwadda	Nominated	
