= Monica Birwinyo =

Ugandan actress (born 1990)

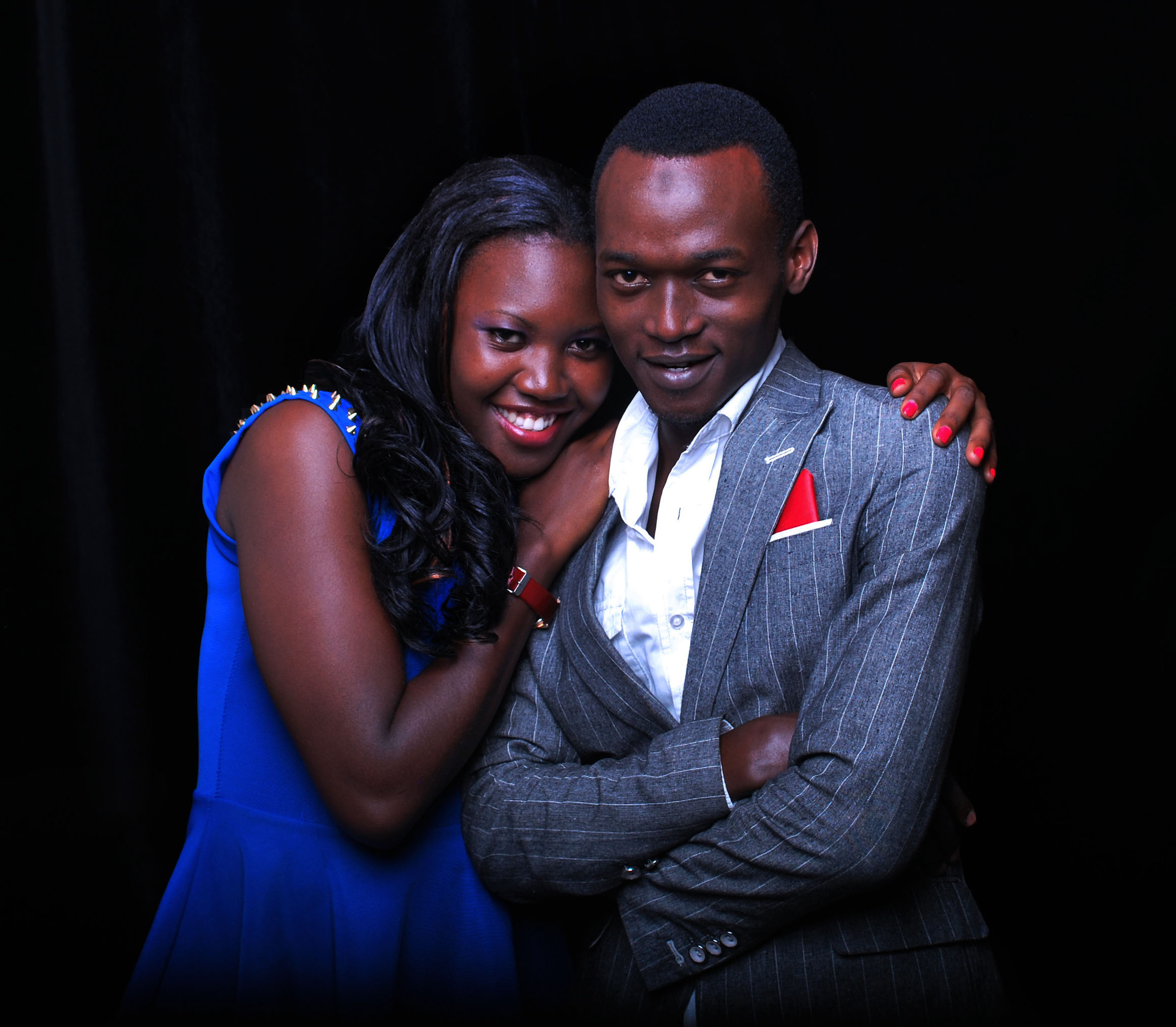
- Movie Digest Show 2013 cover with Monica and Usama
- Born: Monica Birwinyo; June 4, 1990 (age 36); Uganda
- Occupations: Actress, TV personality, Rally Driver, Rally Codriver, Motosport Official
- Years active: 2010–present

Monica Jacobs Birwinyo (born 4 June 1990) is a Ugandan actress and television personality. She began her career as an actress starting with uncredited roles and moving on to recurring roles on Imbabazi, The Pardon, Irene Kulabako's Beauty to Ashes^{[1]} and the NBS hit series Because of U. In 2019, she joined motorsport and she has participated as a codriver, a driver, official and was involved in initiative promoting women's participation in motorsport under Women in Motorsport Uganda organisation.

== Career ==
Monica began her acting career with minor and uncredited roles before receiving recurring roles in Ugandan film and television productions. She appeared in Irene Kulabako's "Beauty to Ashes", the NBS Television series "Because of U" and Joel Karekezi's Film "Imbabazi: The Pardon", in which she portrayed Muhoza.

In March 2012, Monica Birwinyo, Irene Asumpta and Jacob Nsaali were confirmed as the co-hosts of the first season of the Movie Digest Show.^{[2]} She co-presented the second season with Usama Mukwaya.^{[3]} Her later television credits included the role of Justine in "The Honourables" and Flower in "Hotel Mara". Her film credits include "Shattered Glass" "Twine is Missing" and "Law of Consequences".

=== Motorsport career ===
Birwinyo is a rally driver, co-driver and rally official affiliated with Eastern Motor Club which is a member of Federation of Motorsport Clubs of Uganda (FMU). Her club profile records show her first motorsport event as the Busiika Sprint in 2019 and her affiliation with Eastern Motor Club from 2022.

In 2023, she competed as Faisal Kayiira's codriver. She later partnered with Isaac Ssozi in the 2024. In 2025, Birwinyo navigated for Edward Kirumira in the National Rally Championship. "New Vision" described her as a seasoned co-driver while reporting on the crew's participation in the Rajiv Ruparelia Memorial Rally.

Birwinyo has also been involved in Women in Motorsport Uganda (WIM.UG) as a founding member, an initiative established to encourage and support women to break barriers and increase participation in motorsport.

In July 2026, she served as Clerk of the Course (COC) for fourth round of the Ugandan National Rally Championship, organised by Eastern Motor Club in the districts of Soroti and Katakwi. She became the first female COC to run a round of the National Championship in Ugandan Motorsport.

Birwinyo previously served as deputy COC in URDA Championship Sprint in Garuga, she was at COC for a grassroot event in Jinja at the end of 2025. These appointments formed part of her progression from rally competition into event organisation, command and safety.

Monica also served as an official at the 2025 and 2026 editions of WRC safari rally in Kenya, working in command and stage safety operations.

=== Motorsport education and mentorship ===
In December 2024, Birwinyo Monica graduated for the FIA University's certificate in Motorsport Leadership and Management Programme during the FIA general assemblies in Kigali Rwanda. She also completed several courses with FIA university including Modern Sports Governance, and CSO.

In February 2026, she graduated from Uganda Olympic Committee's Advanced Sports Management Course. The programme, conducted with the support from the International Olympics Committee's Olympic Solidarity Initiative, leads to a diploma in Managing Olympic Sports Organisation.

Birwinyo has participated in FIA programmes supporting women involvement in motorsport. During an FIA Girls on Track programme in Kigali, she introduced participating girls to motorsport and karting and provided introductory training and mentorship. She has also mentored women through an FIA mentorship programme and she acquired a Badge.

== Television ==
Year	Title	Role	Director	Aired on
2023 to present	Hotel Mara	Flower	Atonga Media	Pearl Magic and Pearl Magic Prime
2021	What If	Suzie	Richard Mulindwa	Pearl Magic and Pearl Magic Prime
2021	The Kojja	Sister Love	Dilman Dila	Pearl Magic and Pearl Magic Prime
2016–2020	The Honourables	Justin	John Ssegawa	NTV Uganda, Pearl Magic, and Pearl Magic Prime

== Film ==
Year	Title	Role	Director	Notes
2023	Twine is Missing	Gina Mahari	Roger Matelja Mugabire	M-Net
2023	Law of Consequences	Kirabo	Dilstories	M-Net
2022	Shattered Glass	Naava	Matovu Martin	M-Net
