= Black Glove =

Ugandan film

- Directed by: Angella Emurwon
- Written by: Douglas Dubois Sebamala
- Produced by: Douglas Dubois Sebamala
- Starring: Laura Kahunde; Gladys Oyenbot; Aganza Kisaka; Joy Agaba; Morris Mugisha; Amon Nuwamanya; Doreen Nabbanja; Sarah Nansubuga
- Cinematography: Ibrahim Babangida; Anthony Kan
- Production companies: Sebamala Arts; SOLOFX
- Release date: 2021
- Country: Uganda
- Language: English

Black Glove is a Ugandan mystery-thriller-fashion noir film created and produced by Douglas Dubois Sebamala and directed by Angella Emurwon. The film follows three friends who go on a vacation on Independence Day and they meet a beautiful woman whose actions lead them to be investigated upon, and they can't trust each other. The film was produced by Sebamala Arts in association with SOLOFX.

== Cast ==
It stars Laura Kahunde as Norah, Gladys Oyenbot as Shamila, Aganza Kisaka as Grace, Joy Agaba as Nankya, Morris Mugisha as Brook, Amon Nuwamanya as Nathan, Doreen Nabbanja as Mutabaazi and Sarah Nansubuga as Detective.
