= Kyaddala =

Ugandan television series

- Kyaddala Season 2 Official Poster
- Genre: Drama
- Written by: Louis Muhereza; Rehema Nanfuka; Josephine Kabahuma; Meddy Sserwadda; Ivan Tusabe; Loyd Lutara; Allan Manzi; Emmanuel Ikubese
- Directed by: Usama Mukwaya
- Starring: Harmony Kyomugisha Muhwezi; Anita Fabiola; Brian Abajah; Michael Tamale; Allan Toniks; Lucy Bunyenyezi
- Theme music composer: Naava Grey; Kaz Kasozi
- Country of origin: Uganda
- Original languages: English; Luganda
- No. of seasons: 2
- No. of episodes: 20

Production
- Executive producer: Humphrey Nabimanya
- Producers: Usama Mukwaya, Edward Balwase (Season 2)
- Production locations: Kampala, Uganda
- Cinematography: Shafik Sserwadda, Alex Ireeta, Loukman Ali
- Editor: Shafik Sserwadda
- Running time: 25 minutes
- Production companies: Reach A Hand Uganda, Incredible Media, Emmanuel Ikubese Films (Season 1),

Original release
- Network: NBS TV, Pearl Magic Prime
- Release: 4 October 2019

Kyaddala is a Ugandan drama television series by Reach a Hand Uganda. The first season was produced by Emmanuel Ikubese Films and Reach a Hand Uganda. Set in a present day high school life, Kyaddala a Luganda word for "It's Real", focuses on real life social issues that affect young people across Africa and their attempts to overcome those issues. The series features actors and actresses from Uganda, Kenya, Rwanda, and Nigeria. Kyaddala premiered on 27 September 2019 at Kingdom Kampala.

== Plot ==
=== Season 1 ===
Eze's mother brings him with her from Nigeria to Uganda where she is taking up a new job. Eze has to get used to a new school, new people in a new country. He immediately becomes friends with Wonny, a rugby and soccer captain, gets in his circle of friends and makes a few enemies of himself when he starts hitting on Shamim. Eze, Wonny, Shamim, Umutoni all have different social, personal, financial and academic issues affecting them and with the help of each other, they devise means on how to overcome these issues.

=== Season 2 ===
Kyaddala II follows the lives of high school old friends who are reunited by their admission to university. Caleb struggles with living an HIV positive life, a secret he keeps so long before it threatens to take his life, kills his friendships and takes away the only thing that mattered to him; 'Vapors lounge', a popular hangout spot that becomes the center of reunion with his new friend Wonny. Umutoni's past comes back to haunt her but this time through her friend Fifi, when she relives her friend's worst nightmare, faced with the hard choices she will choose to protect her girl child. The mysterious Miss Tina finds her true love when she meets Dave a struggling and disabled musician who makes it against all odds, while Shamim's independence from her recent marriage comes at a cost when she decides to defy the odds and take chances on making it on her own.

== Cast and characters ==
=== Main cast ===
- Brian Abajah as Caleb Otto (Season 2)
- Michael Tamale as Wonny (Season 2)
- Anita Fabiola as Ms Tina (Season 1-2)
- Allan Toniks as Dave (Season 2)
- Harmony Kyomugisha Muhwezi as Shamim (Season 1-2)
- Lucy Bunyenyezi as Fifi (Season 2)
- Olumide Oworu as Eze (Season 1)
- Martha Kay as Umuthoni (Season 1)
- Steven Katusiime as Wonny (Season 1)
- Tevin Waiguru as Kalungi (Season 1)
- Mathew Nabwiso as Mr G (Season 1-2)

=== Selected recurring cast ===
- Raymond Rushabiro as Shamim's father (Season 1-2)
- Patrick Salvador Idringi as Wonny's father (Season 1-2)
- Sammy Wetala as Bryo (Season 1-2)
- Azande Rhoda as Becky (Season 1-2)
- Musumba Allen as Shamim's Mother (Season 1-2)
- Cleopatra Koheirwe as Rahu Counselor (Season 1-2)
- Fauziah Nakiboneka as Dave's Mother (Season 2)
- Zion Kente as Aaliya (Season 2)
- Sam Bagenda as Mr. Otto (Season 2)
- Moses Kiboneka as Dr. Male (Season 2)
- Prisca Draru as Linda (Season 2)
- Laura Kahunde as Jussy (Season 2)
- Emmanuel Ikubese as Jeff (Season 1)
- Doreen Mirembe as Nurse Betty (Season 1)
- Eleanor Nabwiso as Ms Kiiza (Season 1)
- Patriq Nkakalukanyi as Dero (Season 1)
- Mandela Felicity as Sabrina (Season 1)
- Hellen Lukoma as Kalungi's Girlfriend (Season 1)
- Musiime Nicole as Daniella (Season 1)
- Nodryn Evanci as Linda (Season 1)
- Katamba Minah as Metroni (Season 1)
- Nicole Maimo Tumusiime as Mama Kalungi (Season 1)
- Ampire Daphne Rubaramira as RAHU Counsellor (Season 1)
- Namanda Veronica Kiwanuka as Wonny's Mother (Season 1)
- Nuwamanya Amon as Headmaster (Season 1)
- Morris Mugisha as Rugby Coach (Season 1)

== Premiere ==
The series premiered at a black-carpet and a gold and black dress code event at the Kingdom Kampala on 27 September with most of the cast present. The series started airing in Uganda on NBS Television on 4 October, and Emmanuel Ikubese, the executive producer and director of the series announced that it would air in Nigeria, Kenya and later across the African continent. Kyaddala is a Luganda word meaning It's Real, hence the sub-title of the series.

Musical artists Kenneth Mugabi, Allan Toniks, Geosteady, Naava Grey accompanied by Kampala Symphony Orchestra (KSO) performed at the event.

== Production ==
The series was produced by Emmanuel Ikubese Films together with Reach A Hand Uganda. Season one trailer was released on 24 September ahead of the series premier on 27 September 2019. The series started airing on 4 October 2019 on NBS TV. It was shot on location at Hana International Mixed School in Kampala and stars actors from Nigeria, Kenya and Uganda and aimed at addressing issues affecting all African youths. Usama Mukwaya joined the series as the producer, Emmanuel Ikubese and Humphrey Nabimanya executive produced the series while Loukman Ali, Alex Ireeta did cinematography and Lloyd Lutara and Allan Manzi joined as writers together with the show creator, Emmanuel Ikubese. The series was Ikubese's directorial debut.

== Reception ==
The series was well received by critics. Roy Ruva of Chano8 wrote that the series would change the face of television in Uganda. It was confirmed that series will be renewed for a second season. According to Usama Mukwaya, the show producer, the new is being written by a diverse team. "We have a diverse and inclusive crew of writers and cast, both seasoned and novices. We are also using this platform to nurture new talent", Usama Mukwaya said.

Season 2 was in a university setting and highlighted challenges faced by young people at an advanced level of education, building upon the first season, which focused on secondary school life.

It was announced that Kyaddala would air again on Pearl Magic Prime both season one and two beginning 3 July 2022.

== Awards ==
=== Nominated ===
- 2022: Uganda Film Festival Award for Best Actor in a Television Drama for Olumide Oworu
- 2021: Best tv and webseries, 7th Mashariki African Film Festival
- 2022: Uganda Film Festival Award for Best Television Drama
- 2022: Uganda Film Festival Award for Best Actor in a Television Drama for Jawar Lwanda
- 2022: Uganda Film Festival Award for Best Actress in a Television Drama for Tracy Kababiito

== Episodes ==
=== Series overview ===
Season	Episodes	Originally aired	
Season	Episodes	First aired	Last aired
1	8	4 October 2019	22 November 2019
2	12	4 March 2022	

=== Season 1 (2019) ===
No. overall	No. in season	Title	Directed by	Written by	Original release date
1	1	"Pilot"	Emmanuel Ikubese	Emmanuel Ikubese, Lloyd Lutara, Allan Manzi	4 October 2019
Eze's mother moves from Nigeria to Uganda for work and he joins a new school in Uganda. He has to adapt to the new environment and make friends. Wonny is forced to choose between studies and sports.
2	2	"Jollof Rice"	Emmanuel Ikubese	Emmanuel Ikubese, Lloyd Lutara, Allan Manzi	11 October 2019
Eze finds a friend in Shamim and Kalungi, her ex is not at all happy with this new friendship between her and the new student. He goes on a mission to end their relationship by tormenting Eze.
3	3	"Game On"	Emmanuel Ikubese	Emmanuel Ikubese, Lloyd Lutara, Allan Manzi	18 October 2019
Mr. G promises to private tutor Umutoni and when she shows up in his office, it's a completely different story. Meanwhile Eze is interested in learning to play rugby but his biggest opponent is not willing to let that happen.
4	4	"The Date"	Emmanuel Ikubese	Emmanuel Ikubese, Lloyd Lutara, Allan Manzi	25 October 2019
Persuaded by the girls, Umutoni thinks she can try something with lover boy - Kalungi but this does not go well when Mr G finds out. As well, Jeff and Ms Tina get their relationship to another level when they go on a date for the first time.
5	5	"Visitation Sunday"	Emmanuel Ikubese	Emmanuel Ikubese, Lloyd Lutara, Allan Manzi	1 November 2019
It's visitation Sunday and a lot is happening. Jeff comes through to visit Eze and to check on Ms Tina, who is still mad about Eze finding out on their relationship with Jeff. Wonny's parents come through as well and the father is still not into Wonny playing rugby. Shamim's parents come to visit her as well and they are still particular about her finishing High School and get married.
6	6	"The Jump"	Emmanuel Ikubese	Emmanuel Ikubese, Lloyd Lutara, Allan Manzi	8 November 2019
Persuaded by his wife, Wonny's father finally accepts him to play after Eze is kicked out while fighting with Kalungi. Kalungi and his boys convince Umutoni to escape with them while the rest of the school is attending a party and the results are far from everyone's expectation.
7	7	"Mwanangu (My Son)"	Emmanuel Ikubese	Emmanuel Ikubese, Lloyd Lutara, Allan Manzi	15 November 2019
After being raped by Mr G, Umutoni thinks shes pregnant and when she tell the girls, they want her to abort. Meanwhile, after being ambushed at the club, Kalungi finds himself home and has to face her mother as to why he is home before end of school.
8	8	"End of Term"	Emmanuel Ikubese	Emmanuel Ikubese, Lloyd Lutara, Allan Manzi	22 November 2019
The school term has come to an end. Umutoni is pregnant, Kalungi is HIV positive, Shamim's parents have not changed their plans for her and Mr. G's mess has been discovered.

=== Season 2 (2022) ===
No. overall	No. in season	Title	Directed by	Written by	Original release date
9	1	"Heirs"	Usama Mukwaya	Louis Muhereza	4 March 2022
Shamim faces the grim reality of an early marriage when she has to choose between starting a family and completing her university education, ready to take on the risks of losing it all, she chooses her dream over everything else. Caleb's player days are getting warmer with a string of ladies lined up for his tastes as he launches himself into the entertainment business as he prepares to launch his new bar business. Wonny's road to addiction begins the day he sets foot into university, with pressure to make ends meet and live the life. .
10	2	"Different intentions"	Usama Mukwaya	Rehema Nanfuka	11 March 2022
Caleb launches his new bar and socialite hang out University lounge in style with reunions bound to happen. Linda is cornered by peer influence to break her virginity while faces the nightmare of her life when Umutoni's Aunt dumps a baby at her place claiming birds of the same feathers should stay together. A chance meeting between Miss Tina and Dave ends with a promise of future dates but unfortunately for Miss Tina, her overprotective Lover Oyello is hell bent on keeping her under his fists.
11	3	"Euphoria"	Usama Mukwaya	Josephine Kabahuma	18 March 2022
Afraid of nursing her husband's suspicion, Shamim decides to heed Madina's advice and get better family planning methods to keep both her dream and marriage intact. Miss Tina's private life leaks on all social media platforms, she has no fight left in her when she finds out who her enemy is. Fifi struggles to get rid of Umutoni's baby, her constant crying is ruining her social lifestyle, and she finds it harder than she thought while Caleb's promising business and new status in society comes to a halt when a student overdoses on drugs he sold.
12	4	"Scars"	Usama Mukwaya	Tusabe Ivan	25 March 2022
Dave's musical career is taking a new high after his meeting with Producer Fx, he has an opportunity to perform on a big stage but the lights go out on him when he is booed off stage with flying bottles, a career shattered before it can begin. Fifi hell-bent on looking for solutions to get rid of the baby stumbles upon an unlikely idea to take the child back to the father, tough for her but she decides it is the only solution to getting her life back. Wonny takes the fall for vapours lounge, he is arrested.
13	5	"New Romantics"	Usama Mukwaya	Meddy Sserwadda	1 April 2022
Caleb is fascinated by a young naïve Linda and decides to shoot his shot but is coldly rejected, Caleb agrees to take things slow and take her on a proper date, they make plans but he never show. With her secret revealed, Hajji Hamza refuses to pay Shamim's tuition until she gives him proof that she is pregnant, a dream is crushed. Tina tries her best to fight herself out of a binding sexual relationship with Oyello and his numerous string of campus girlfriends, her reconnection with Dave lights up a moment of hope.
14	6	"Skeletons in the closet"	Usama Mukwaya	Rehema Nanfuka	8 April 2022
Fifi finds out she made the biggest mistake thinking a rapist would be apologetic and willing to make up for his mistake when Mr G harasses and abuses her out of his house, she vows to seek revenge on behalf of Umutoni. Miss Tina begrudgingly accepts the relationship she is in afraid of losing everything she has even with a prospect of a new found love with Dave. Hajji Hamza accuses Shamim of bowing to peer pressure and taking drugs, he places Shamim under house arrest and tries to force himself onto her, she fights her way out of the marriage. And, someone knows Caleb's best kept secret while Dave's musical career is in ignition, the right people are noticing.
15	7	"Ugly Consequences"	Usama Mukwaya	Meddy Sserwadda	15 April 2022
Caleb refuses to bow to the pressure of the blackmailers, his positive HIV status leaks and everyone he slept with is worried. Dave signs a recording contract with a major label in town and is lined up for success, Tina is there to witness, placing herself in danger when Oyello finds out, and the results are evident the next day. Shamim finds herself on the dark streets with no place to stay after failing to live up to the expectations of her wild and crazy friends.
16	8	"Damaged brands"	Usama Mukwaya	Josephine Kabahuma	22 April 2022
Caleb slides into depression, drinking becomes a daily necessity and suicidal thoughts cross his mind to a point where he feels trapped and it is the only solution. Linda is there to pick the spoils. Fifi teams up with a lawyer and charges are brought against Mr G, she spearheads a campaign to get justice for sexual violence survivors. Shamim lands a job at a bar, she finds out she has a lot to learn if she is to stay sane in this world. Dave's career suffers a bump when he Is accused of sexually harassing Melissa, he denies it but it's his word against hers.
17	9	"New Lives"	Usama Mukwaya	Tusabe Ivan	29 April 2022
Caleb agrees to see a counsellor, mystified by Linda's support and acceptance he starts his yet toughest journey in living positively, he is tested and must overcome. Hajji Hamza realizes his mistake and makes a U-turn back to finding Shamim, she is not interested and neither is he willing to push his luck. With Fifi’ss campaign to get justice for the survivors of sexual harassment taking root and making waves through the university, Amanda joins the ‘men are trash movement’ when she gets played by Bryo.
18	10	"Shame On You"	Usama Mukwaya	Meddy Sserwadda	6 May 2022
Caleb shocks the world with a viral video message opening up about his HIV status proudly sponsored by Linda's support and Counsellor Belinda's help, the two are the envy of their peers perplexed by their choices. Miss Tina breaks ties with Oyello but those she loves will pay the price WHEN Mr Oyello decides to scare Dave off his ‘woman’. Fifi's campaign suffers a major setback when compromising photos of her label her unfit to lead the movement, her validity is questioned and she will have to stand firm to keep her goal in sight. Vapors lounge rebrands its tarnished image with Dave on the list of performers.
19	11	"Bad games"	Usama Mukwaya	Tusabe Ivan	13 May 2022
Caleb finds the name of the person responsible for blackmailing him, he is shocked as much as surprised. Dave's previous bone breaking encounter only strengthened his Love with Tina and the two enjoy an enviable relationship as Miss Tina seeks closure with the dean and justice for his crimes. Shamim is convinced her parents have learnt the lesson and will listen to what she wants, she decides to go back home and is joyously welcomed by her mother.
20	12	"Blood price"	Usama Mukwaya	Rehema Nanfuka	20 May 2022
Celebration on two fronts as Miss Tina receives the news that Mr Oyello has been fired from campus and charges brought up against him and Fifi's campaign against sexual violence celebrates a court ruling when Mr G is sentenced to Prison. Timba confronts Caleb and promises him doom if he fails to pay for Wonny's mistakes. Wonny seeks the courage to own up to his mistakes but it is too late, Caleb is ready to roast him for lying to him, Shots are fired and they both lay on the ground motionless. Mr Oyello meets his grim end at the hands of an anonymous machete.
