= Mona Ombogo =

Kenyan screenwriter and author

- Born: Kenya
- Occupations: Screenwriter, author, blogger
- Years active: 2007–present
- Notable work: Unseen, Unsung, Unforgotten (2008); Volume (2023)

Mona Ombogo is a Kenyan screenwriter, author, and blogger known for her work in film, television, and literature.

== Early life and education ==
Ombogo was born in Kenya and raised in Eswatini (formerly Swaziland). She received her education in Kenya, the United States, and the United Kingdom.

== Career ==
Ombogo has worked in the Kenyan film and television industry since 2007.

She wrote the feature film Unseen, Unsung, Unforgotten (2008), which received nominations at the Kalasha Film Awards, including Best Script and Best Picture.

She has also worked on other film and television projects, including Inherited (2017).

In 2023, Ombogo was a writer on the Netflix music drama series Volume, for which she received the Africa Magic Viewers' Choice Award for Best Writing in a Series in 2024.

In 2025, she was selected to participate in the AuthenticA Series Lab, an initiative by the Realness Institute supporting emerging African screenwriters.

In addition to screenwriting, Ombogo is also an author and has written books including V for Visa.

== Awards and recognition ==
Ombogo has received recognition for her work in film and television.

- Africa Magic Viewers' Choice Awards – Best Writing in a Series, Volume (2024)
- Kalasha Film Awards – Nominations for Best Script and Best Picture, Unseen, Unsung, Unforgotten (2008)
