= Annet Nandujja =

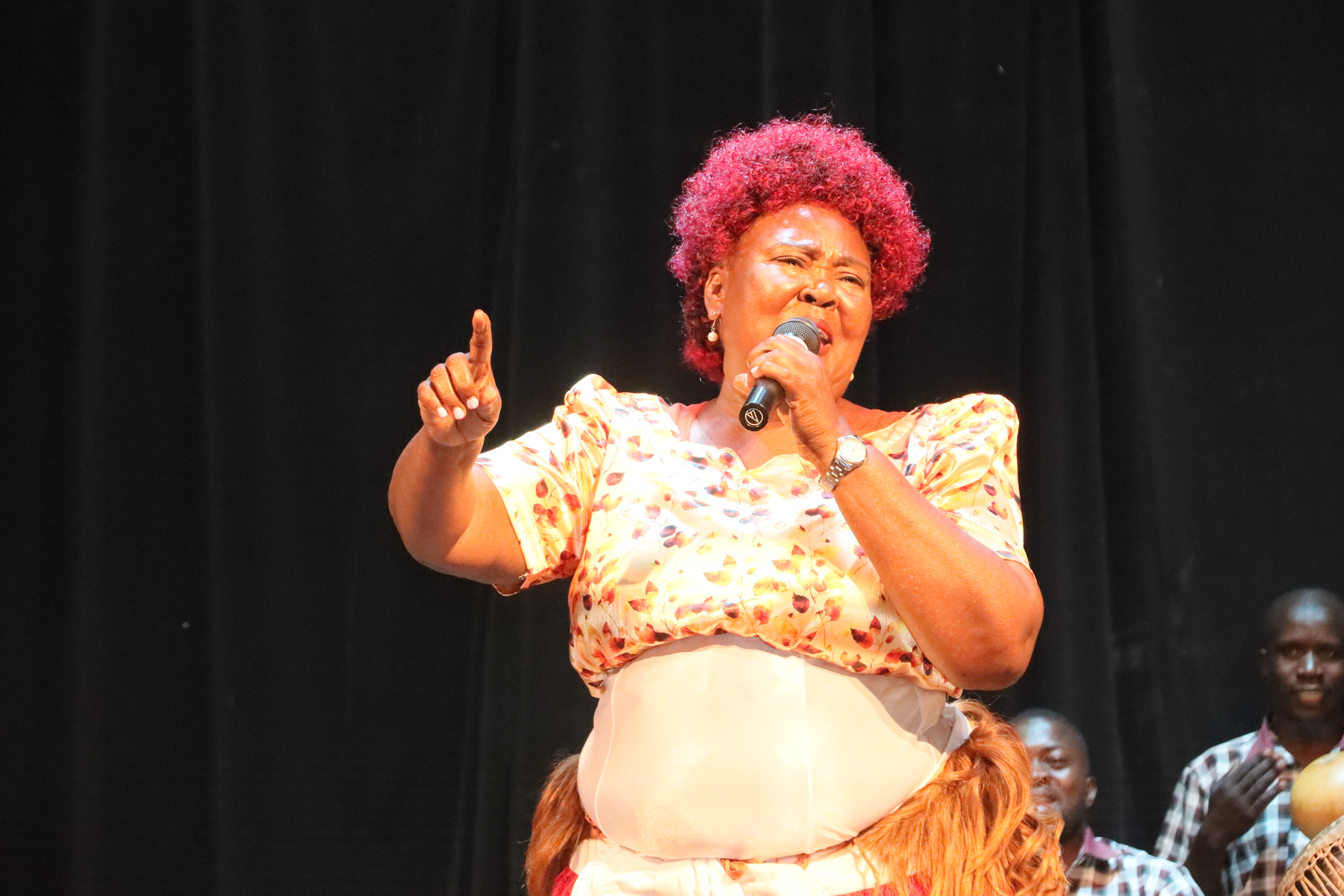
- Born: 1959 (age 66–67); Uganda
- Occupations: Musician, composer, dancer, TV Host
- Musical career
- Genres: Ugandan traditional folk
- Instruments: Percussion, vocals

Annet Nandujja is a Ugandan traditional folk musician, composer and dancer. She sings in Luganda and performs with her group, The Planets.

== Background ==
Nandujja was born in 1959, in Kanoni Village in Ggomba sub-county, Wakiso District. She grew up in Kibinge Village, Masaka District. She formed the planets band with Kiyimba Musisi and Erasmus Ssebunya in the early 1990s. The group now has 45 members. They perform traditional roots folk music from Buganda.

== Awards and recognition ==
'The Planets' won the 2005 Pearl of Africa Music Awards for best cultural group in Uganda. Nandujja won the first prize in the 2018 National Cultural Heritage Awards. She was recognised in the Intangible Cultural Heritage category for helping to preserve traditional Kiganda dances such as Bakisimba, Amaggunju and Nankasa. Her albums include "Etooke", "Obufumbo Bwaleero", "Akalagaane Kukuuma Butonde" and "Tuulimukuzunga".

== Discography ==
- Etooke
- Obufumbo Bwaleero
- Tuulimukuzunga
- Akalagaane Kukuuma Butonde
