= Nambi (film) =

2023 film directed by Peter Mukiibi

- Directed by: Peter Mukiibi
- Written by: Peter Mukiibi
- Produced by: Dennis Arthur Abwakat; Usama Mukwaya
- Starring: Doreen Nabbanja; Bint Kasedde; Jenkins Joel Mutumba; Opio Moses Isingoma
- Cinematography: Izaek Ekuka
- Production company: Addmaya
- Release date: 2023
- Running time: 27 minutes
- Country: Uganda
- Languages: English, Luganda, Swahili, Dutch

Nambi is a 2023 adaptation of a Ugandan folk tale called Kintu written and directed by Peter Mikiibi.

== Plot ==
A goddess from the heavenly realm sets out to live with a caveman Kintu on Earth despite her father, Ggulu's wishes. Her troublesome brother Walumbe attempts to hinder the affair while her youngest brother Kayikuzi does everything to protect her.

== Cast ==
- Doreen Nabbanja as Nambi
- Bint Kasedde as Kintu
- Jenkins Joel Mutumba as Kayikuuzi
- Opio Moses Isingoma as Walumbe
- Michael Musoke as Ggulu

== Reception ==
It won an award for best international short film - audience award at the 2023 Kortfilmfestival Kalmthout and was nominated for the Best Short film in the 2023 Uganda Film Festival.
