= 7th Pearl International Film Festival =

The 7th Pearl International Film Festival took place in Kampala, Uganda from 6th to 10 November 2017. Rain won Best Picture. First time director Daniel Mugerwa won the best director prize. Filmmaker Rhonnie Nkalubo Abraham was named the Festival Director.

== Jury ==
- Polly Kamukama
- Andrew Kaggwa
- Maurine Kintu

== Awards ==
The following awards were presented at the 7th edition.

BEST FEATURE FILM

- Rain

BEST DIRECTOR

- Daniel Mugerwa (Rain)

BEST MALE ACTOR

- Bwanika Baale felix (Faithful)

BEST FEMALE ACTOR

- Aganza Kisaka (Faithful)

BEST YOUNG ACTOR

- Toni Rucci (The Last Breath)

BEST SHORT FILM

- The Last Breath

BEST DOCUMENTARY

- Omweso

BEST SCREENPLAY

- Rain

BEST TELEVISION DRAMA

- Ba Aunt

BEST CINEMATOGRAPHY

- Alex Ireeta (Love Faces)

BEST SOUND

- Breaking with Customes

BEST PRODUCTION DESIGN

- Rain

BEST COSTUME

- Vvolongoto Mu Mukwano

BEST SPECIAL EFFECTS AND MAKEUP

- Faithful

ACHIEVEMENT IN EDITING

- My Ex-girlfriend

BEST SUPPORTING ACTOR

- Faisal Katumba (SenteMuki)

BEST SUPPORTING ACTRESS

- Joanita Bewulira (Rain)

BEST INDIGENOUS LANGUAGE FILM

- Vvolongoto Mu Mukwano

Life Achievement Award

- Joanita Bewulira

Jury Award

- Pearl Wonders

Piff Directors Award (Trail Blazer)

- Mariam Ndagire
