= Omugave Ndugwa =

Ugandan writer (died 2022)

- Born: Joseph Semakula Ndugwa
- Died: June 9, 2022
- Citizenship: Uganda
- Occupations: author, script writer, director and producer

Joseph Semakula Ndugwa, commonly known as Omugave Ndugwa, was a Ugandan writer. He had over 40 years of experience in Uganda's arts industry as an author, script writer, director and producer. He wrote over 30 plays, 300 poems, and a couple of films.

== Biography ==
Ndugwa, in 1969, joined the Jinja Dramatics Society (JDS) and, in 1971, the Kampala Negro Angels.

In 1978, after leaving the Negro Angels, he co-founded the Black Pearls with Omulagira John Kayondo and others. Ndugwa's long-time friend, Edrisa Wankalubo Simwogerere, supported the group's establishment by providing resources.

After a challenging period in the late 1990s, Ndugwa returned to Uganda from the U.S. in 2000, reviving and renaming the Riverside theatre as The Pearl theatre. However, evolving audience preferences and logistical issues resulted in declining popularity, leading to Ndugwa's eventual retreat and the venue's transformation into a motor vehicle spare parts shop.

Notable works produced during his career include, Obulamu Bwa Sambirige and Office Njerere.

Before his death, he had embarked on movie production, a chapter he began in 2013 with a film version of his 1988 play “Emikwano nsi” which he directed and co-produced with Hemdee Kiwanuka.

Ndugwa died on June 9, 2022 after suffering from prostate cancer.

== Bibliography ==
- Obulamu bwa Ssembirige (1972)
- Olugendo lwa Wasajja (1974)
- Ssegirinya ne Naggirinya (1975)
- Sseruganda Tontya (1976)
- Office Njereere (1975)
- Nsalala n’Omukwano (1978)
- Wasajja mu Bizinga by’e Sesse (1978)
- Ekitangaala mu Nzikiza (1981)
- Oluyimba lw’e Nderema (1983)
- Omusaayi gw’obutiko (1983)
- Zziribasanga ne Ssanyu (1983)
- Ggalimpitawa (1984)
- Amaka mu Buwanganguse (1985)
- Emikwano Nsi (1988)
- The Divided Family – Oluyo (1988)
- Ekimuli mu Maggwa I (1988)
- Ekimuli mu Maggwa II (1989)
- The Narrow Escape – Olugwanyu (1990)
- Traffic Jam – Akalippo (1991)
- Olutindo lw’Emomboze – The Orphan's Bridge (1991)
- Saa Mbaya (1992)
- Ku Saawa Esembayo (1992)
- Mayengo (1994)
- Ekkoligo (1995)
- Enseekeezi (1996)
- Eka (1996)
- Erindya (1998)
- Nnamukwakula (1998)
- Endalagge (1999)
- Kirimuttu (2000)
- Ssekkono (2003)
