= Tiktok (film) =

- Theatrical release poster
- Directed by: Usama Mukwaya
- Written by: Usama Mukwaya
- Produced by: Bobby Tamale; Usama Mukwaya
- Starring: Patriq Nkakalukanyi
- Cinematography: Alex Ireeta
- Edited by: Alex Ireeta
- Music by: Nessim Mukuza
- Production company: O Studios Entertainment
- Release date: March 11, 2015
- Running time: 19 minutes
- Country: Uganda

Tiktok is a 2015 Ugandan silent short film written and directed by Usama Mukwaya. The movie features single actor Patriq Nkakalukanyi as Sam. It is Usama's first film under his film company O Studios Entertainment and is his first film as a writer, director and producer. The film premiered at the inaugural Mashariki African Film Festival and received a nomination for best short film.

== Plot ==
After being appointed to a new job, Sam (protagonist) begins his much-anticipated first day at work. He arrives, but this time around with precautions to manage his previously disorganized self. He drafts a new set of guidelines to help him improve and break out of his bad past habits, only to realize that some of the guidelines at work are against him. When he finally maneuvers through the preparation tasks, towards exiting the house, he notices that neighbors have been waiting for him on the door to join them to go for church service. He now realizes he had woken up on a wrong day, the day just before the actual day he must start work.

== Cast ==
- Patriq Nkakalukanyi as Sam

== Production ==
Principal production of the film began in September 2014. Director Usama Mukwaya hired Alex Ireeta as Director of Photography, having worked with him on his previous film Bala Bala Sese.
