= Hadijah Nakanjako =

Ugandan actress, film director and producer

- Born: Mityana, Uganda
- Education: Kyambogo University (Bachelors Arts Degree in Education)
- Occupations: Film director; film producer; actress

Hadijah Nakanjako (born 18 July) is a Ugandan actress, film director and producer. She is best known for the Debut film The Passenger that won best indigenous film as the Uganda Film Festival Awards(UFF). The film also received two nominations at Amvca Awards.

Nakanjako directed her debut film The Passenger, which premiered on Maisha Magic Movies, a Dstv channel. Commissioned by Mnet, the film was written by Meddy Sserwadda, and produced by Usama Mukwaya through O Studios Entertainment. It stars Henry Nathan Katongole, Allen Musumba, and Olot Bonny Elem in leading roles. It received 11 nominations at the Uganda Film Festival 2023 and won five awards. It was also nominated twice at the 2024 Africa Magic Viewers' Choice Awards.

Her film 9 lives was nominated in the 2023 Uganda Film Festival for best short film.
