= Alex Ireeta =

Ugandan Filmmaker

- Born: Alex Ireeta Nabudere; 12 August 1982 (age 44)
- Occupations: cinematographer, Film Editor
- Years active: 2006–present
- Notable work: Bala Bala Sese, Love Faces, Kony: Order From Above, Veronica's Wish
- Website: https://www.imdb.com/name/nm5704313/

Alex Ireeta Nabudere is a Ugandan Film editor and cinematographer.

== Career ==
Alex Ireeta is a Ugandan multi award-winning Cinematographer / Director of Photography and film Editor with almost 20 years experience in filmmaking, previously working under the filmmaking outfit 'YesThatsUs'. Alex is an alumnus of Berlinale Talents 2012, at the Berlin Film Festival, where he attended in-depth workshops on cinematography and had the opportunity to interface with industry professionals in similar disciplines.

Since 2014, Ireeta has worked on his debut project as director of photography on Bala Bala Sese. He is best known for his collaborations with filmmakers like Sadiq Mugisha, Bashir Lukyamuzi, Usama Mukwaya, Steve Ayenye, Allan Manzi, Nisha Kalema, Rehema Nanfuka and many others. He has received numerous nominations and awards for his work, on films that have made waves locally and globally, including receiving the Best Cinematography and Best Editing and Post Production at the Uganda Film Festival 2018.

Over the years as cinematographer, some of Ireeta's award-winning film projects including Bodaboda Thieves, Veronica's Wish, Kony: Order From Above, Love Faces, JDC TV drama series, Kyaddala TV drama series for RAHU, TV commercials for MTN, UHMG, Airtel and several music videos for Juliana, Peter Miles, Chameleon, A Pass, Elephant Man, Demarco, General Levi among many others.

== Awards ==
=== Won ===
- 2017: Best Cinematography, 7th Pearl International Film Festival
- 2018: Best Cinematography, 8th Pearl International Film Festival
- 2018: Best Cinematography, Viewer's Choice Movie Awards
- 2018: Best Cinematography, Uganda Film Festival
- 2018: Best Editing and Post Production, Uganda Film Festival

== See also ==
- Bala Bala Sese
- Sadiq Mugisha
- Pearl International Film Festival
- Uganda Film Festival
- Ugandan cinema
