= MNFPAC =

Mariam Ndagire Film and Performing Arts Centre is a Uganda-based training film initiative for emerging filmmakers and mentorship programme for aspiring filmmakers and youth in Uganda. It encompasses film production, screenwriting, directing, producing, cinematography, editing, sound recording, and acting.

== Origins ==
MNFPAC was established in 2010 by film producer and singer Mariam Ndagire. MNFPAC aims at improving and elevating Uganda's entertainment industry through nurturing committed, honest and disciplined artistes.

== Notable alumni ==
- Usama Mukwaya
- Doreen Mirembe
- Nkalubo Rhonnie Abraham
- Kenneth Mugerwa
- Laura Kahunde
- Nabagereka Faridah
