= Mariam Ndagire =

Ugandan singer, actress, filmmaker (born 1971)

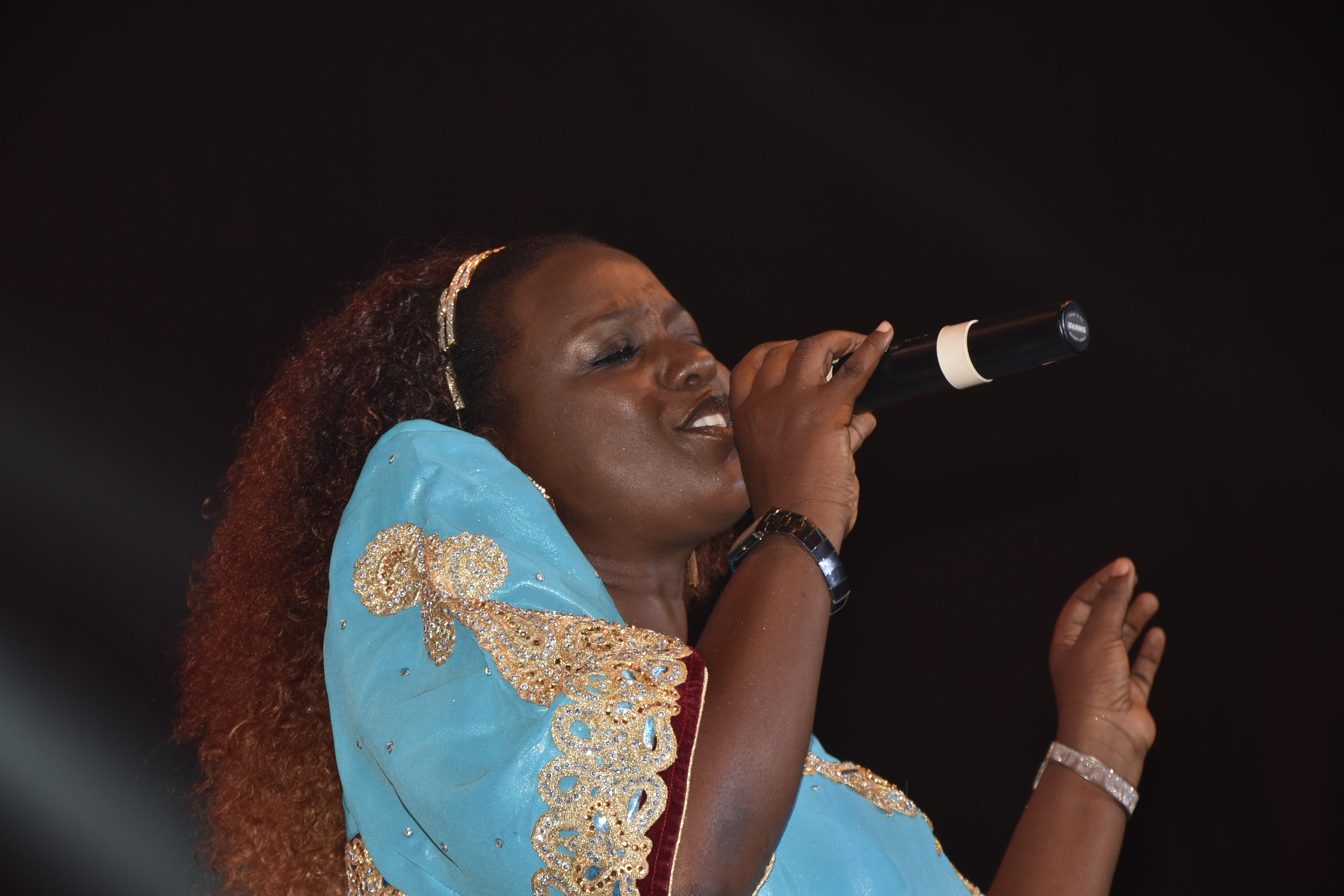
- Born: 16 May 1971 (age 55); Kampala, Uganda
- Education: Makerere University Business School (Higher Diploma in marketing) Diploma in music, dance and drama
- Occupations: Singer, film producer, actress, scriptwriter, film director
- Awards: BA-AUNT Pearl International Film Festival, 2017

Mariam Ndagire (born 16 May 1971) is a Ugandan singer, entertainer, actress, playwright, film director, and film producer.

== Beginnings and education ==
She was born in Kampala, Uganda's capital city, to Sarah Nabbutto and Buganda's Prince Kizito Ssegamwenge. She attended Buganda Road Primary School, before transferring to Kampala High School, where she completed her O-level education. For her A-Level studies, she attended Trinity College Nabbingo, in Wakiso District, where she graduated with a High School Diploma.

She went on to obtain a Higher Diploma in Marketing from Makerere University Business School in Nakawa. Later, she was awarded a Diploma in Music, Dance and Drama, from Makerere University, Uganda's oldest and largest public university.

== Performing career ==
Ndagire started out as a theatre actress, at age 15, while still a student at Kampala High School. She went on to join the Black Pearls of Omugave Ndugwa in 1987, where she starred in several plays up until 1993. While there, she co-wrote her first play titled "Engabo Y'addako". Later Ndagire, together with Kato Lubwama and Ahraf Simwogerere formed their own group the Diamonds' Ensemble and they wrote several plays.

Ndagire is so passionate about helping young talent find themselves in the performing arts; that is the reason that she started The Next Ugandan Music, an American Idol-style show. Ndagire also started a new training workshop for filmmakers at her center, the Mariam Ndagire Film and Performing Arts Centre MNFPAC, which holds film workshops for filmmakers every year. Among the workshops' notable participants are Sarah Kisauzi Sentongo, an actress with Deception, the NTV Uganda TV series, and screenwriter Usama Mukwaya.

In 2015 Ndagire was appointed by AFRICA MAGIC VIEWERS' CHOICE AWARDS AMVCA to be part of the JURY.

In 2019 Ndagire was appointed as a committee member of the Grand Jury of the GOLDEN MOVIE AWARDS AFRICA.

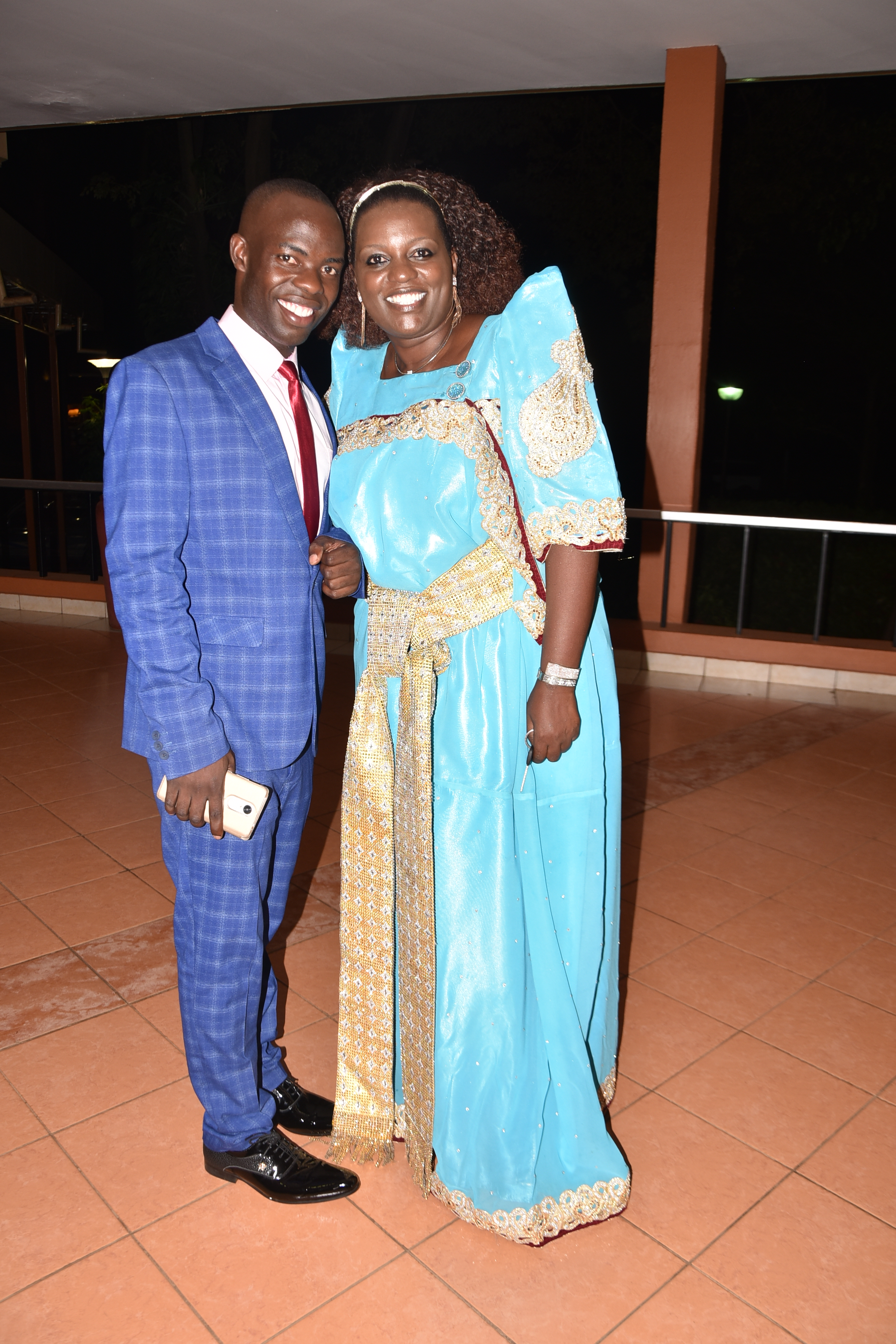
Mariam Ndagire with Chris Evan Kaweesi

== Film and television ==
Year	Title	Production role	Notes
2007	Down This Road I Walk	Writer, director, producer, actress	Feature film
2008	Strength of a Stranger	Writer, director, producer, actress	Feature film
2009	Hearts in Pieces	Writer, director, producer, actress	Feature film
2010 – ongoing	Tendo Sisters	Writer, director, producer, actress	TV series
2011	Where We Belong	Writer, director, producer, actress	Feature film
2012	Dear Mum	Writer, director, producer, actress	Feature film
2013 – on going	Anything But Love	Writer, director, producer	TV series
2013	Belated Trouble	Writer, director, producer, actress	Feature film
2013	You Can't Break My Will	Writer, director	Short movie
2015 – on going	J-Rose	Writer, director, producer	TV series
2016	Vicky's Dilemma	Director, producer	Short Movie
2016	Intimate Partner Violence series	Director, producer	Short Movie
2017	Nsaali	Writer, director, producer	Feature Film
2017 – ongoing	BA-AUNT	Writer, director, producer, actress	TV series
2017	KAALA	Producer	Short Movie
2019 - ongoing	OUR PERFECT WEDDING UGANDA	Director, producer	Wedding Reality TV Show
2020	On The Otherside	Writer, director, producer	Feature Film
2021	My Husband's Wife	Writer, director, producer	Feature Film
2022	Kafa Coh	Asha Nkono (Actress)	Feature Film
2025	Call 112	Teopista Ndyanabo	Short film
2026	Longing To Belong	Writer, director, producer	Feature Film
2026	Ekitiibwa Ky'olubugo	Executive Producer	Documentary Film

== Awards and nominations ==
List of awards and nominations
Year	Nominated work	Award	Category	Result
2013	WHERE WE BELONG	Uganda Film Festival Award	Best Cinematography	Nominated
2013	WHERE WE BELONG	Uganda Film Festival Award	Best Sound	Nominated
2017	BA-AUNT	Pearl International Film Festival	Best TV Drama	Won
2017	NSAALI	Pearl International Film Festival	Best Actress "Dinah Akwenyi"	Nominated
2017	NSAALI	Pearl International Film Festival	Best Indigenous Language Film	Nominated
2017	NSAALI	Pearl International Film Festival	Best Sound	Nominated
2017	NSAALI	Pearl International Film Festival	Best Screenplay "Mariam Ndagire"	Nominated
2017	NSAALI	Pearl International Film Festival	Best Director "Mariam Ndagire"	Nominated
2017	NSAALI	Pearl International Film Festival	Best Supporting Actor "Sebugenyi Rogers"	Nominated
2017	NSAALI	Pearl International Film Festival	Best Young Actor "Nalumu Shamsa"	Nominated
2017	NSAALI	Pearl International Film Festival	Best Young Actor "Dinah Akwenyi"	Nominated
2017	NSAALI	Pearl International Film Festival	Best Feature Film	Nominated
2018	BA-AUNT	Zanzibar International Film Festival	Best TV Drama	Nominated
2021	My Husband's Wife	Pearl International Film Festival	Best Actor "Sekimpi Johnmary"	Won
2021	My Husband's Wife	Pearl International Film Festival	Best Ugandan Feature Film	Won
2021	My Husband's Wife	Pearl International Film Festival	Best Costume	Nominated
2021	My Husband's Wife	Pearl International Film Festival	Best Screenplay "Mariam Ndagire"	Nominated
2021	My Husband's Wife	Pearl International Film Festival	Best Director "Mariam Ndagire"	Nominated
2021	My Husband's Wife	Pearl International Film Festival	Best Supporting Actress "Tania Shakira Kankindi"	Won
2021	My Husband's Wife	Pearl International Film Festival	Best Uganda Feature Film	Nominated
2022	My Husband's Wife	Uganda Film Festival Awards	Best Editor "Suuna Peter"	Nominated
2022	My Husband's Wife	Uganda Film Festival Awards	Best Actor "Sekimpi JohnMary"	Nominated
2022	My Husband's Wife	Uganda Film Festival Awards	Best Screenplay "Ndagire Mariam"	Nominated
2022	My Husband's Wife	Uganda Film Festival Awards	Best Supporting Actress "Tania Shakira Kankindi"	Won
2022	My Husband's Wife	Africa Magic Viewers' Choice Awards	Best Movie East Africa "Mariam Ndagire"	Nominated

== Partial discography ==
- Mulongo Wange (1997)
- Bamugamba (1998)
- Onkyaye (2000)
- Nkusibiddawo (2001)
- Kamuwaane (2002)
- Abakazi Twalaba (2003)
- Akulimbalimba (2004)
- Akalaboko (2007)
- Maama (2007)
- Byonna Twala (2009)
- Majangwa (2009)
- Oly'omu (2012)
- Kiki Onvuma (2014)
- Kibun'omu (2016)
