= Amakula International Film Festival =

Film festival in Uganda

Amakula Kampala International Film Festival
- Location: Kampala, Uganda
- Founded: 2004
- Founded by: ISF
- Language: International
- Website: amakula.org//

The Amakula Kampala International Film Festival is an annual film festival that took place in Uganda from 2004 to 2012. It is Uganda's oldest film festival founded by Dutch art historian Alice Smits and American filmmaker Lee Ellickson.

== History ==
The inaugural Amakula Kampala International Film Festival was held on May 21, 2004. The incentive was to bring African and world cinema to audiences in Uganda and provide inspiration, network possibilities and filmmaking training to local filmmakers and film enthousiasts alike. The festivals center was the National Theater, while also showing films in various community theaters. In several video halls a selection of African films were live translated in the Luganda language by the local VJs, which in later editions of the festival let to an outdoor VJ slam.

The annual festival was curated around a theme each year, showcasing films from around the world, offering a wide range of historical as well as contemporary films around annual themes with a special focus on African cinema. The festival brought many international and mainly African filmmakers to Kampala to present their films, engage in discussions and provide film workshops which were held during the festival. Each year an East African Cinema Congress was organized, bringing together filmmakers and stakeholders from Uganda and region together to discuss and share ideas and experiences on the development and networking of the film industry in East Africa. The festival also organized an East African film competition.

A special feature of the festival was its multi-disciplinary performances, bringing local videomakers together with dancers, musicians and storytellers. Each year various music groups were assigned to perform with silent films. These special programs received attention from abroad and in 2007 Percussion Discussion Africa performed with a silent film program in a sold out venue at the South Bank Center during World London, while also performing during the Rotterdam International Film Festival in the Netherlands of the same year.

== Setback ==
The last edition of the festival took place in 2012 because of ending of financial support. On 16 March 2016 it was resumed with a different kind of programming under a new management, moving from Amakula Cultural Foundation to now being presented by Bayimba Cultural Foundation.
