= Pearl International Film Festival =

Film festival in Uganda

- Location: Kampala, Uganda
- Founded: 2011
- Awards: Pearl
- Website: www.pearlfilmfestival.com

The Pearl International Film Festival (PIFF), is an annual film festival held in Kampala, Uganda. It has been described as one of the biggest film events in Uganda. PIFF is a non-governmental organization founded by Moses Magezi and established in 2011 to develop and promote film and other cultural industries as catalyst for the regional social and economic growth. The first edition of PIFF happened at the National Theatre and still will holds other edition every May.

== The festival ==
The annual multi disciplinary arts and cultural festival is PIFF’s major activity; the festival is an all-arts affair, with a week of screenings of the best local cinema and an awarding evening Gala. The festival also aims to draw attention to raise the profile of films with the aim of contributing towards the development of cinema, boosting the film industry worldwide and celebrating Ugandan cinema at currently at the national level.

The PIFF festival now runs 5 programs over a week that include:

1. Film Awards
2. Film Workshops
3. Students Programmes
4. Exhibition

During the festival, films are shown in the capital Kampala.

== Awards ==
- Best Film
- Best Cinematography
- Best Documentary
- Best Short/Animation
- Best Actor Feature
- Best Actress Feature
- Best Writer
- Lifetime Achievement Award
- PIFF Award
- Best Editor
- Best Director
- Best Film Journalist
- Best Media House
- Best Sound
- Best Production Design

== See also ==
- Cinema of Uganda
