= List of Ugandan actors =

This is a list of notable actors and actresses from Uganda. This list includes members of the Ugandan diaspora.

== A ==
- Akite Agnes born 19 March 1983 (age 43)
- Arnold Oceng born 30 November 1985 (age 40)
- Doreck Ankunda
- Allan Manzi

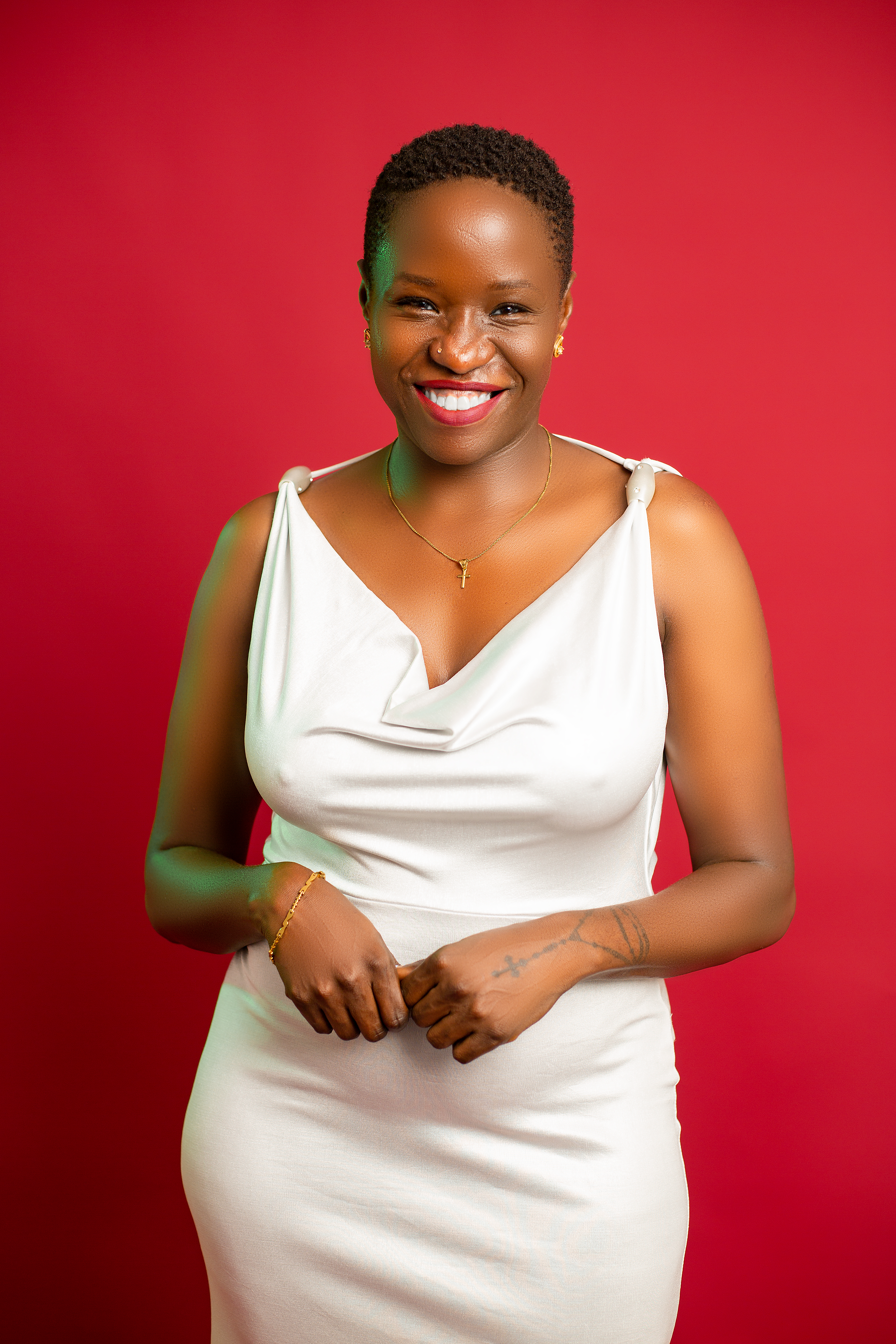
Akite Agnes, 2025

== B ==
- Bettinah Tianah born 10 November 1993 (age 32)
- Bobby Tamale born 28 August 1984 (age 41)
- Sam Bagenda born 31 March 1965 (age 61)
- Susan Basemera (fl. 1995–present)
- Monica Birwinyo born 4 June 1990 (age 36)
- Ruth Kalibbala Bwanika born 9 September 1997 (age 28)

== C ==
- Esteri Tebandeke born 16 May 1984 (age 42)
- Kemiyondo Coutinho

== F ==
- Anita Fabiola born 7 June 1994 (age 32)

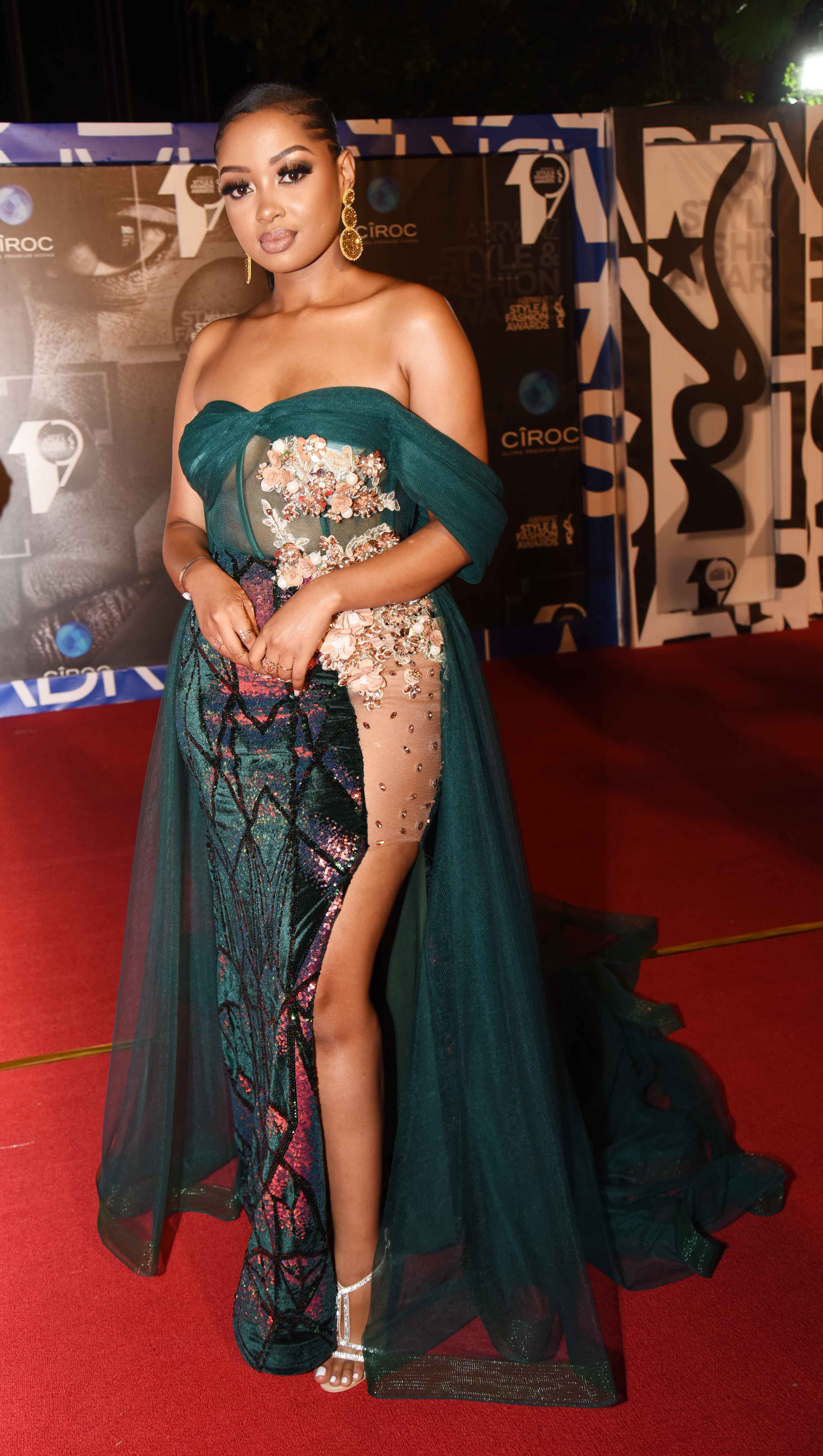
Anita Fabiola, 2019

== G ==
- Richard Gibson born 1 January 1954 (age 72)

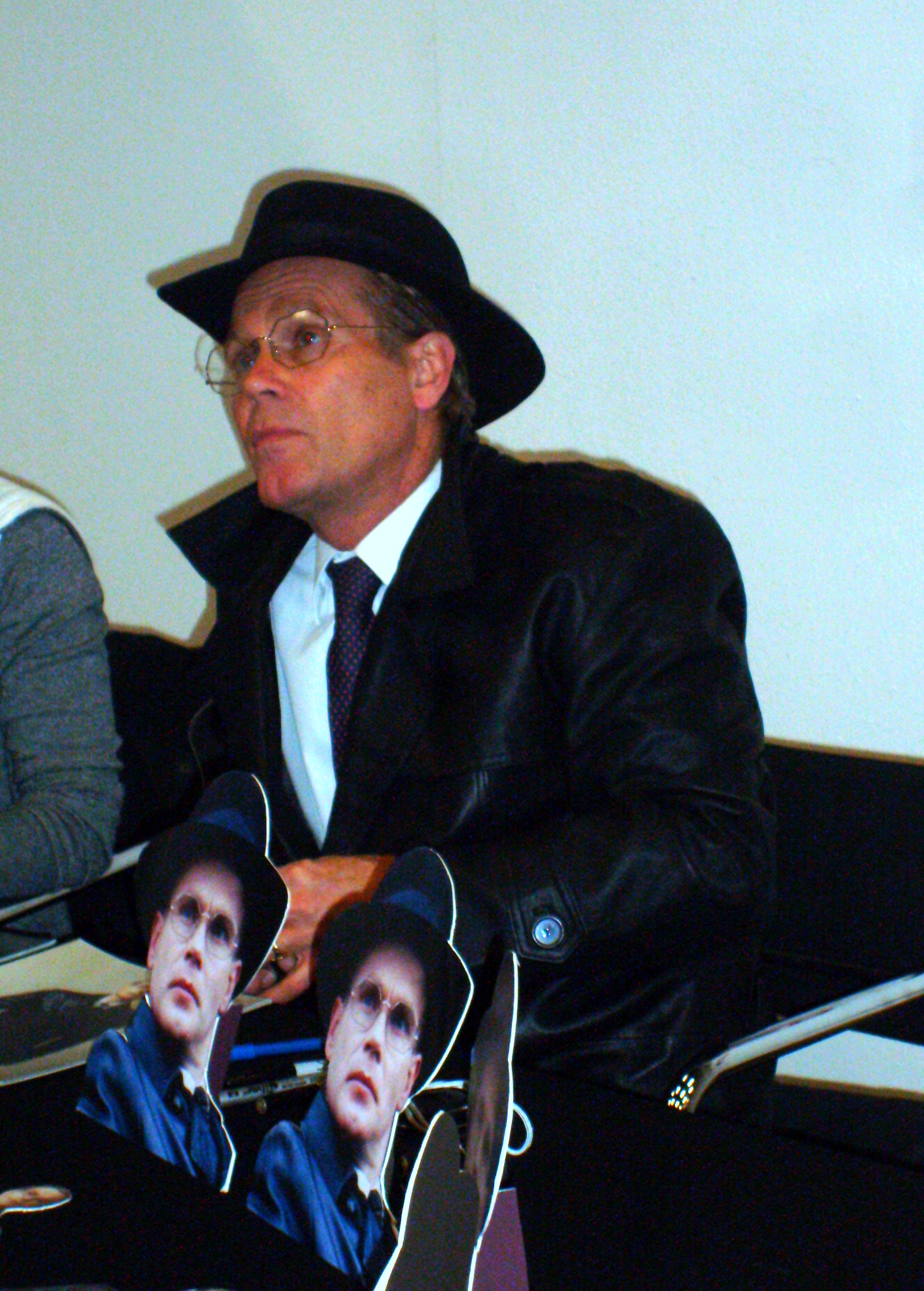
Richard Gibson, 2011

== I ==
- Milka Irene born 1989 (age 36–37)

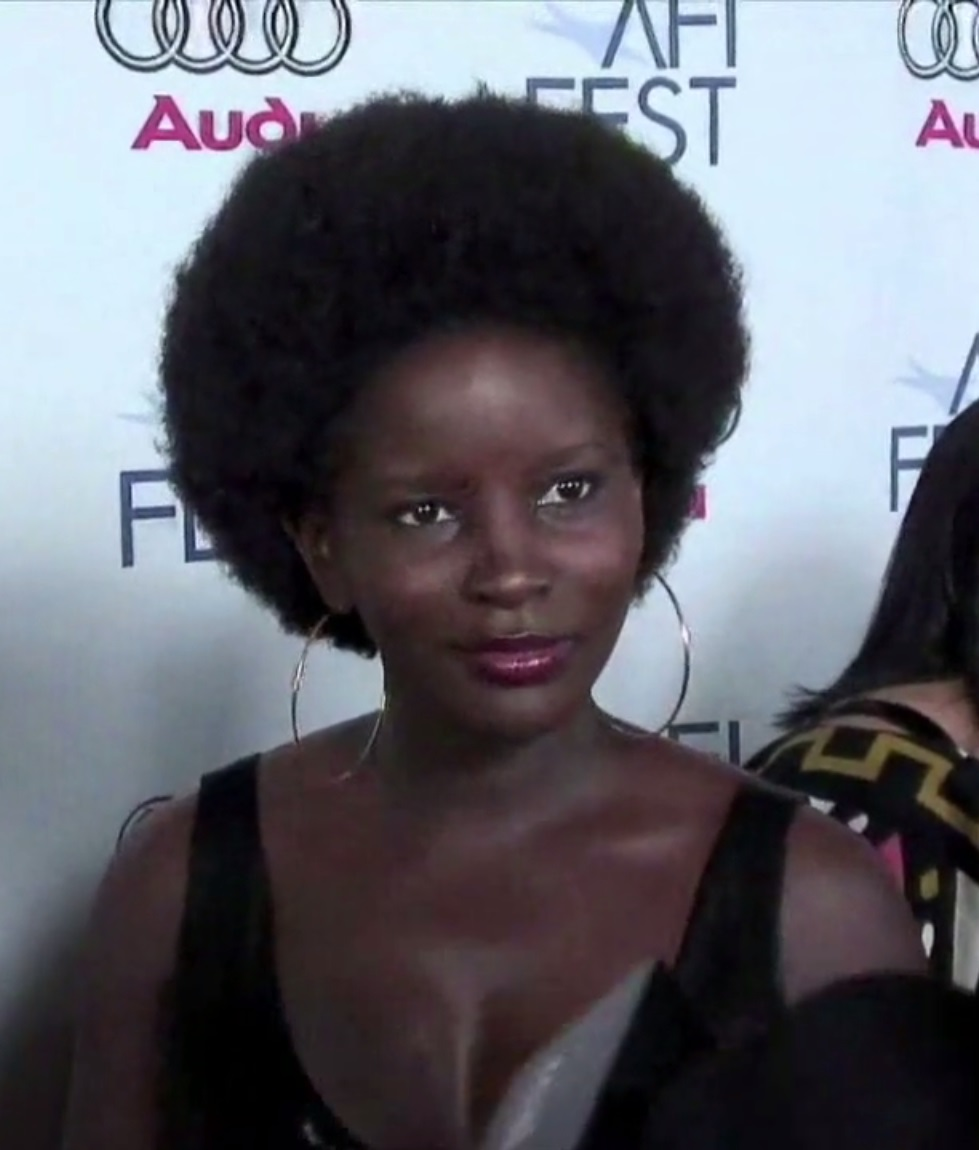
Nana Hill Kagga, 2008

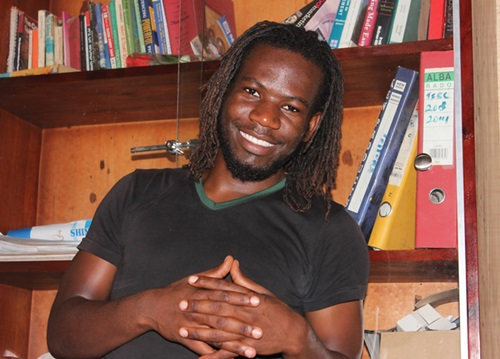
Arthur Kisenyi, 2016

== K ==
- Leila Kalanzi Kachapizo born 5 December 1979 (age 46)
- Nana Kagga born 6 April 1977 (age 49)
- Gaetano Kagwa born 22 June 1972 (age 54)
- Laura Kahunde born 23 October 1988 (age 37)
- Nisha Kalema born 1993 (age 32–33)
- Nancy Kalembe born 15 September 1980 (age 45)
- Anne Kansiime born 13 April 1986 (age 40)
- Juliana Kanyomozi born 27 November 1980 (age 45)
- Sheebah Karungi born 11 November 1989 (age 36)
- Michael Kasaija (fl. 2010-present)
- Florence Kasumba born 26 October 1976 (age 49)
- Danny Keogh (1948-2019)
- Acaye Kerunen born 1981 (age 44–45)
- Bruno Kiggundu born 21 July 1992 (age 34)
- Maurice Kirya born 4 November 1984 (age 41)
- Aganza Kisaka
- Sarah Kisawuzi born 11 November 1953 (age 72)
- Arthur Kisenyi born 10 January 1990 (age 36)
- Cleopatra Koheirwe born 15 January 1982 (age 44)
- Aisha Kyomuhangi

== L ==
- Evelyn Nakabira Lagu born 1 June 1982 (age 44)
- Mary Lewis (fl. 1988-present)
- Kato Lubwama (1970–2023)
- Hellen Lukoma

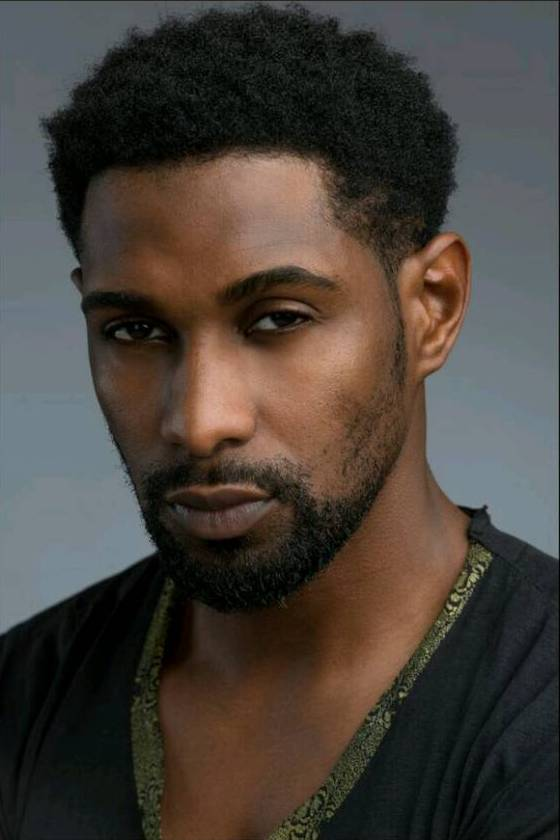
Housen Mushema, 2018

== M ==
- Cindy Magara born September 1982 (age 43)
- Malaika born 15 December 1989 (age 36)
- Stecia Mayanja born 26 May 1985 (age 41)
- Rose Mbowa (1943-1999)
- Doreen Mirembe born 4 October 1987 (age 38)
- Morris Mugisha (fl. 2013-present)
- Alex Muhangi born 9 October 1985 (age 40)
- Usama Mukwaya born 12 December 1989 (age 36)
- Housen Mushema born 29 March 1992 (age 34)
- Ntare Guma Mbaho Mwine born 1967 (age 58–59)

== N ==
- Eleanor Nabwiso born 24 February 1989 (age 37)
- Mathew Nabwiso
- Leila Nakabira born 1993 (age 32–33)
- Hadijah Nakanjako born 1987 (age 38–39)
- Fauziah Nakiboneka born 15 May 1977 (age 49)
- Madina Nalwanga born 15 March 2002 (age 24)
- Halima Namakula born 1 January 1960 (age 66)
- Aaliyah Nanfuka born 25 August 1986 (age 39)
- Rehema Nanfuka born 25 May 1986 (age 40)
- Maureen Nankya born 17 September 1988 (age 37)
- Stellah Nantumbwe born 1991 (age 34–35)
- Mariam Ndagire born 16 May 1971 (age 55)
- Abby Mukiibi Nkaaga born 8 February 1968 (age 58)
- Nakaayi Dorcus Tasha born July 27, 2019 (age 7)

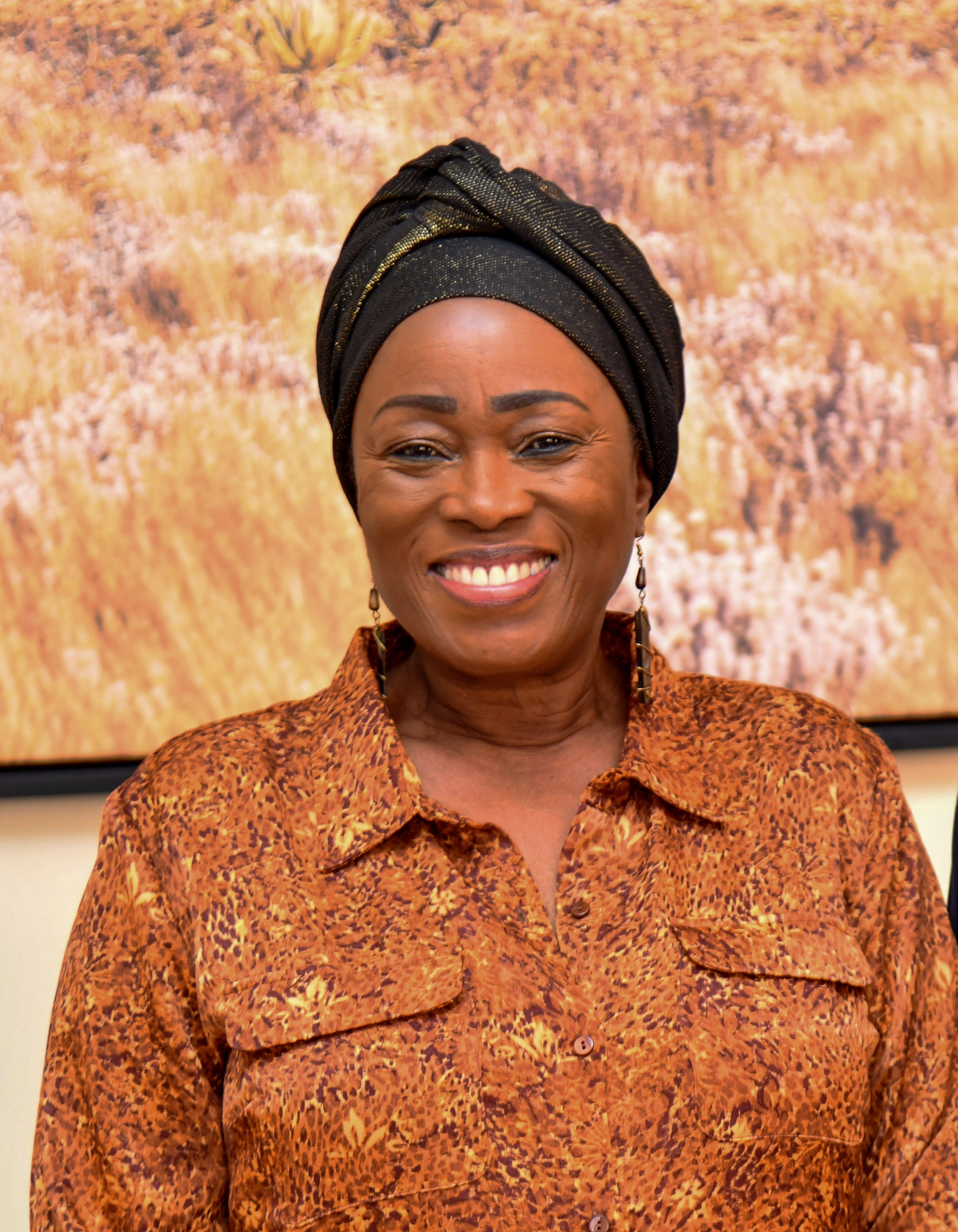
Halima Namakula, 2025

== O ==
- Peter Odeke born 21 November 1970 (age 55)
- Joel Okuyo Atiku born 4 December 1983 (age 42)
- Gladys Oyenbot born 11 July 1982 (age 44)

== P ==
- Pelly Peninah
- Whitney Peak born 28 January 2003 (age 23)
- Philip Luswata

== R ==
- Raymond Rushabiro
- Rutamirika (1959–2008)

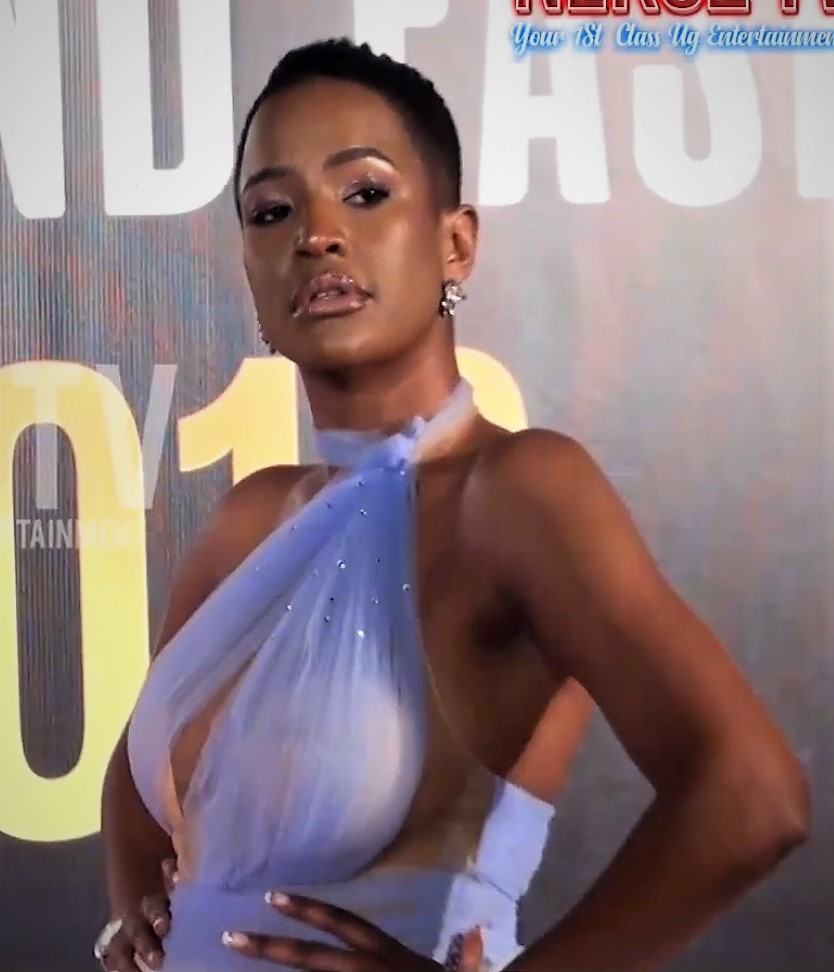
Natasha Sinayobye, 2019

== S ==
- Natasha Sinayobye born 20 January 1989 (age 37)
- Herbert Mendo Ssegujja born 27 September 1983 (age 42)
- Ashraf Ssemwogerere (fl. 1980-present)
- Patrick Ssenjovu born July 1975 (age 51)
- Richard Sseruwagi born 8 August 1954 (age 71)

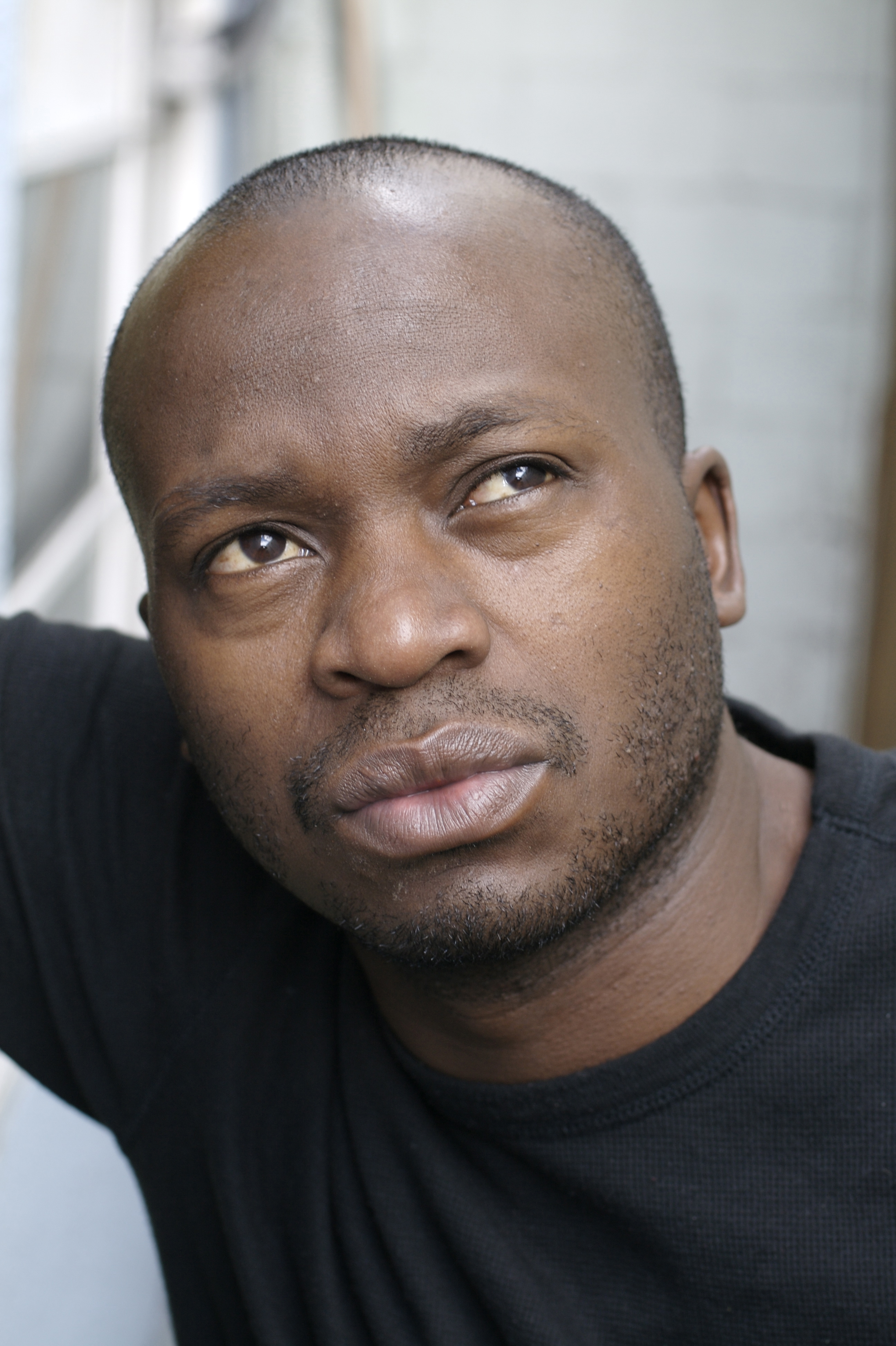
Patrick Ssenjovu, 2008

== T ==
- Flavia Tumusiime born 11 February 1989 (age 37)
- Richard Tuwangye born 16 October 1980 (age 45)

== W ==
- Michael Wawuyo Sr. born 11 November 1948 (age 77)
- Michael Wawuyo Jr. born 17 December 1987 (age 38)
- Bobi Wine born 12 February 1982 (age 44)

== See also ==
- List of Ugandan people
- Cinema of Uganda
