= Fauziah =

Fauziah is a female given name, a variant of Fawzia, used mainly in Malaysia.

- Tuanku Tengku Fauziah (born 1946), queen consort of Perlis, Malaysia
- Fauziah Ibrahim, Singaporean Australian news presenter, of Malay descent.
- Fauziah Latiff (born 1970), Malaysian singer and actress.
- Fauziah Mohd Taib (born 1955), Malaysian diplomat and author.
- Fauziah Nakiboneka (born 1977), Ugandan actress, singer, dancer and humanitarian.
