= Gashumba =

Gashumba is a surname. Notable people with the surname include:

- Diane Gashumba, Rwandan pediatrician, medical administrator, politician, diplomat
- Frank Gashumba (born 1974), Ugandan businessman
- Sheilah Gashumba (born 1996), Ugandan media personality
