= Murerwa =

Murerwa is a surname. Notable people with the surname include:

- Herbert Murerwa, Zimbabwean politician
- Shamim Murerwa, Ugandan musician
