= Lukyamuzi Bashir =

Ugandan film director

- Born: Lukyamuzi Bashir; 7 December 1986 (age 39); Mbarara, Uganda
- Citizenship: Uganda
- Occupations: Film director, music director and producer
- Years active: 2015–present

Lukyamuzi Bashir, also known as Badi (born 7 December 1986 in Mbarara), is a Ugandan music director, film director, producer and creative entrepreneur. He is widely recognized for his work with Badi Musik, a record label and production house through which he has mentored and launched the careers of several major Ugandan artists.

== Early life and educational background ==
Lukyamuzi was born on 7 December 1986 to a Muganda father, Mohammed Bunaku and a Munyakore mother who died when he was still young. Bashir joined Nabagereka Primary School where he developed an early interest in visual arts and story telling then later, Noah's Ark Secondary School.

== Career ==
Lukyamuzi's career began in music direction and video production at Badi music production. He directed Blu*3's video featuring Goodlyfe Crew, Iryn Namubiru's "Bona Obasinga", and "Vumilia" by Chameleone. He also directed Goodlyfe Crew's music videos "Talk n Talk" and "This is how we do it". He is known to work with his friend and artist A Pass. He is credited with introducing and developing talent such as A Pass and Ykee Benda into the music industry.

== Film work ==
He extended his creative works into filmamking, and directed and produced the critically acclaimed 2015 Ugandan drama movie Bala Bala Sese. The film's soundtrack featured the successful single "Wuuyo" by A Pass, another artist with whom Bashir has a close professional relationship. This movie featured Ugandan actors Michael Kasaija, Natasha Sinayobye and Raymond Rushabiro. This enabled Bashir to join the Amakula International Film Festival and Luxor African Film Festival.

Bashir is the Ugandan representative and the director of photography for the South Africa-based music TV Channel O. He has worked on Off the Record, Introducing Keko and 'Lifestyle Uganda for the channel.

He directed his debut film Bala Bala Sese, written by Usama Mukwaya and featuring Ashraf Ssemwogerere.
