= Bwanika =

Bwanika is a surname. Notable people with the surname include:

- Abed Bwanika (born 1967), Ugandan veterinarian, politician, and pastor
- Ruth Kalibbala Bwanika (born 1977), Ugandan actress, radio and TV presenter
