= Rwanda International Movie Award =

International film award event

Rwanda International Movie Award (RIMA)
- Country: Rwanda
- Established: 2012
- Website: rimaward.org

Television/radio coverage
- Directed by: Jackson Mucyo

Rwanda International Movie Award (RIMA) is an annual award event targeted at Rwandan filmmakers, producers, actors, cinematographer and other film professionals. The award ceremony not only targets Rwandan filmmakers but also recognizes international film professionals across Africa. The event is organized by Ishusho Art, a Rwandan Film Institution located in Kigali. Jackson Mucyo' has served as the executive director of RIMA since it was launched.

RIMA has been held annually since 2012. Every year, before the award gala takes place, it is preceded by Rwanda Movie Week, an event which is aimed at involving Rwandan youths in the Film Industry. The activities which usually take place during the Rwanda Movie week includes film screenings, film training, film tours and community services across the country.

== Categories ==
- Best Child Actor
- Best Child Actress
- Best People's Choice Actor
- Best People's Choice Actress
- Best People's Choice Movie
- Best Short Film
- Documentary
- Best Series
- Best Feature Film
- Best Actor
- Best Actress
- Best Director
- Upcoming group / Dynamic Award

== Awards 2023 ==
RIMA local category winners

- Best Supporting Actress: Phionah Igihozo for Indoto series
- Best Supporting Actor: Ivan Abouba Iradukunda
- Best Actor: Emmanuel Mugisha
- Best Actress: Jeanette Bahavu
- Best Local Director: Roger Niyoyita for The Bishop series
- Best Cinematographer: Luis Udahemuka for The Pact series
- Best Sound Engineer: Xavier Nsengiyumva for Above the Brave
- Best Screenplay: Igenoryange
- Best Legendary: Late Prince Nsanzamahoro aka Rwasa
- Best series: Impanga
- Best feature film: Above the Brave
- Best Documentary: Forgiven not Forgotten
- The People’s Choice: Jeanette Bahavu

RIMA East Africa category winners

- Best East Africa Actor: Nkakalukanyi Patriq
- Best East Africa Actress: Zion Kent
- Best Cinematographer East Africa: Emmanuel Dial for Maya film
- Best Sound Engineer: Diana Kairu (Kenya)
- Best Series East Africa: The Bishop’s Family
- Best Feature Film East Africa: Tembele
- Best Director East Africa: Mugisha Hubert for Tembele (Uganda)
- Best Academic East Africa: Option Z

RIMA International category winners

- Best Actor International: IK Obgonna (Nigeria)
- Best Actress International: Ini Edo (Nigeria)
- Best International Short Film: 1795
- Best International Feature Film: When the Levees Broke: A Requiem in Four Acts (Cameroon)
- Best International Documentary: Morocco, Sacrificed Innocence (Maroc, l'innocence sacrifiée) (France)
- Best International Director: Ajalaja Stanley
- Best Legendary Africa: Richard Mofe
- Best International creator: Emmanuel Ejekwu aka Mr Funnyman
