= Fate (2006 film) =

- Directed by: Cindy Magara
- Release date: 2006
- Running time: 135 minutes
- Country: Uganda

Fate was a 2006 Ugandan drama feature film directed by Cindy Magara. It was "the first Kinna-Uganda directed by a woman". The film tells the story of Kate Komuntale, a corporate executive in her thirties who becomes infected with HIV after marrying Ken Bagonzo, a charming but philandering intelligence officer.

Fate was a low-budget, privately produced film. At the time, Magara was a student at Makerere University. Magara gained knowledge and tools to make the movie at Cine Club, a monthly Kampala film forum. She also travelled to Nairobi to find professional help, organizing workshops there to develop the professional skills of her cast and crew. Without government support, she raised money from family, friends and a bank loan. The movie premiered at Hotel Africana on July 30, 2006. It was also shown at the Zanzibar International Film Festival.
