= Sophie Gombya =

- Born: Uganda
- Occupation: musician

Sophie Gombya is a Ugandan musician and social activist. She is married to fellow musician Sam Gombya.

== Early life and education ==
Sophie went to Nakivubo Blue Primary School and then to Kawempe Muslim and later attended Kibibi Senior Secondary School.

== Music ==
Sophie Gomba sings with a sharp soprano and performs with her husband Sam Gombya. She has successful singles like "Spare tyre" about a woman with whom she is competing for the same man which was written by her husband Sam. They have six albums together.

== Discography ==
=== Songs ===
- Nkwesize
- Gyangu gyendi
- Lugya Lumu
- Spare tyre
- Sosotola
- Salawo
- Ngugumuka ekiro
- Ssebo Muko
- Mwenyumirizamu

=== Albums with Sam Gombya ===
- Nkwesize Mu Bbuba
