= Wuuyo =

Single by A Pass
- Released: March 20, 2015
- Recorded: 2014
- Genre: Afrobeats
- Length: 4:31
- Label: LollyPop; Badi Musik
- Songwriter: Alexander Bagonza
- Producer: Nessim

Music video
- Video on YouTube

Wuuyo is a song by Ugandan recording artist A Pass, released on March 20, 2015 as a single. It is on the official soundtrack of the Ugandan film, Bala Bala Sese.

== Background and recording ==
The song was written by A Pass, and recorded by his friend and producer Nessim at Badi Musik in late 2014.

== Music video ==
The music video for "Wuuyo" was premiered in Club Guvnor in the Kampala City on 20 March 2015 and released onto YouTube on Mar 24, 2015 at a total length of 4 minutes and 31 seconds. The video was shot and directed by Lukyamuzi Bashir in Kampala. It features shots from Bala Bala Sese written by Usama Mukwaya and directed by Lukyamuzi Bashir.
