= Ruth Kalibbala Bwanika =

Ugandan actress (born 1973)

- Born: 9 September 1973 (age 52); Kawempe
- Citizenship: Ugandan
- Education: Islamic University in Uganda, Nkumba University
- Occupations: CEO Forks Events, Artist, TV and Radio presenter
- Years active: 1994-date
- Organization: Friends Of Ruth Kalibbala Bwanika
- Television: SparkTV
- Children: she has seven children

Ruth Kalibbala (born in 1973) also known as Ruth Kalibbala Bwanika is a Ugandan actress, radio and tv presenter who has worked for many Ugandan stations including Dembe FM, NTV Uganda and SparkTV.

== Background and Education ==
Kalibbala went to St. Peters Primary School in Nsambya Kampala, Uganda before joining St. Edwards and Nakasero High for her O-level and later Pride Academy for her A-level. In 1999 she did a two-year diploma course in secretarial studies at Nkumba University. In 2017, she graduated with a bachelor's degree in mass communication from Islamic University in Uganda.

== Career ==
Kalibbala co-hosts a weekly morning show called "Twezimbe" on Dembe FM and spark TV, she is the Brand Ambassador for Lifeguard condoms.

In April 2024 she replaced Nakazibwe Faridah on a show known as "Mwasuze Mutya" on NTV Uganda (Faridah Nakazibwe had hosted the show for seventeen years) after which she left in three months to focus on her family and her YouTube channel. She also started a charity organization called Friends of Ruth Kalibbala Bwanika (FORKB).

== Filmography ==
Kalibbala also featured in different Ugandan movies which include.

- Kilagiro Ensitano
- Safari Maswaku
- Gogolimbo Kavavangalo
- Ekimala ebita ebunga
- Ngasuuza entate
- Tendo Sisters
- State of the nation

== Personal life ==
She's married to Bwanika Ssensuwa Charles, and they have seven children.

== See also ==
- Sam Gombya
- Sheilah Gashumba
