= The Forbidden =

Ugandan drama film

- Directed by: Kizito Samuel Saviour
- Written by: Nakamya Marie Anitah
- Screenplay by: Nodryn Evanci; Kizito Samuel Saviour
- Produced by: Nampala Claire
- Starring: Leilah Nakabira; Teddy Musinguzi; Nodryn Evanci; Kaye Trevor
- Cinematography: Rwamusigazi Kyakunzire
- Edited by: Kasozi Austin
- Music by: Nodryn Evanci; Stellah Marie Kwagala
- Production company: The Red Pictures
- Release date: 3 February 2018
- Running time: 125 minutes
- Country: Uganda
- Languages: English, Luganda

The Forbidden is a Ugandan drama film produced by Claire Nampala and directed by Kizito Samuel Saviour.

It premiered at Bat Valley Theatre on 3 February 2018 and was immediately nominated for the Best Feature Film award at the Amakaula International Film Festival and later won the award, becoming the first Ugandan film to win the award since the launch of the awards. The film went ahead to be nominated in more than twenty categories in more than five awarding bodies including Zulu African Film Academy Awards (ZAFAA), Golden Movie Awards, Zanzibar International Film Festival, Africa Magic Viewers' Choice Awards.

== Plot ==
Dian is on a quest to find her long lost father. The quest leads her into darkest moments and the loss of her mother even before she can find her father.

== Awards and nominations ==
Awards & Nominations
Year	Award	Category	Received by	Result	Ref
2019	Lake International Pan African Film Festival (LIPFF)	Best Feature Film		Nominated	
2019	Lake International Pan African Film Festival (LIPFF)	Best Director	Samuels Kizito Saviour	Nominated	
2019	Lake International Pan African Film Festival (LIPFF)	Best Actress	Leila Nakabira	Nominated	
2019	Lake International Pan African Film Festival (LIPFF)	Best Script Scriptwriter	Kizito Samuel Saviour	Nominated	
2019	Lake International Pan African Film Festival (LIPFF)	Best Score (Song)	The Forbidden score	Nominated	
2019	Lake International Pan African Film Festival (LIPFF)	Best Sound Design		Nominated	
2019	Lake International Pan African Film Festival (LIPFF)	Best Editor		Nominated	
2019	Lake International Pan African Film Festival (LIPFF)	Best Production Design		Nominated	
2019	Lake International Pan African Film Festival (LIPFF)	Best Film on Disability		Nominated	
2019	The African Film Festival (TAFF)	Best Actress	Leila Nakabira	Nominated	
2019	The African Film Festival (TAFF)	Best Screenplay	Kizito Samuel Saviour, Nodryn Evanci	Won	
2018	Zanzibar International Film Festival	Best East African Feature Film		Won	
2018	ZAFAA Global Awards	Best Producer	Kampala Claire	Nominated	
2018	ZAFAA Global Awards	Best Director	Kizito Samuel Saviour	Nominated	
2018	ZAFAA Global Awards	Best Actor (Female)	Leila Nakabira	Nominated	
2018	ZAFAA Global Awards	Best Supporting Actor (Female)	Nodryn Evanci	Nominated	
2018	Africa Magic Viewers' Choice Awards	Best Movie East Africa		Nominated	
2018	Uganda Film Festival Awards	Best Cinematography		Nominated	
2018	Uganda Film Festival Awards	Best Script (Screenplay)		Nominated	
2018	Golden Movie Awards	Golden Actress	Leila Nakabira	Nominated	
2018	Golden Movie Awards	Golden Makeup Artiste	Nodryn Evanci	Won	
2018	Golden Movie Awards	Golden Writer	Nakamya Marie Anitah	Nominated	
2018	Golden Movie Awards	Golden Supporting Actress	Nodryn Evanci	Nominated	
2018	Golden Movie Awards	Golden Story (Drama)	Nakamya Marie Anitah	Nominated	
2018	Golden Movie Awards	Golden Cinematography	Rwamusigazi	Nominated	
2018	Golden Movie Awards	Golden Director	Samuel Kizito Saviour	Nominated	
2018	Golden Movie Awards	Golden Most Promising Actress	Leila Nakabira	Nominated	
2018	Golden Movie Awards	Golden Discovery Actor	Leila Nakabira	Nominated	
2018	Golden Movie Awards	Golden Overall Movie		Nominated	
2018	Amakula International Film Festival	Best Feature Film		Won	
