= David Kabanda =

Ugandan politician

Member of Parliament for Kasambya County
- Incumbent
- Assumed office 2021

Head of the Chairman's Office, Patriotic League of Uganda
- Incumbent
- Assumed office 2026

Secretary General of the Patriotic League of Uganda
- In office 7 February 2024 – 15 June 2026
- Succeeded by: Fadil Twalla

Personal details
- Born: April 16, 1990 (age 36) Rwegula Village, Kasambya Sub-county, Mubende District, Uganda
- Citizenship: Ugandan
- Party: National Resistance Movement
- Occupation: Journalist, politician
- Known for: Political commentary and parliamentary leadership

David Kabanda, also known as Daudi Kabanda (born 16 April 1990) is a Ugandan journalist and politician who serves as the Member of Parliament for Kasambya County in Mubende District.

== Early life and education ==
Kabanda was born on 16 April 1990 in Rwegula Village, Kasambya Sub-county, Mubende District. He started his education at Lwegula Primary School before joining Lwemiyaga Primary School where he completed Primary Seven in 2004.

In 2005, he joined St Anne's Secondary School, Ntuusi, before joining Lwemiyaga Secondary School in 2006 and due to financial difficulties, he dropped out in 2007. He joined Macos Secondary School while working at Mbabule FM and completed O-Level education in 2011 and A-Level education in 2013. He received practical training in radio operations while working at Mbabule FM and later obtained a Certificate in Journalism.

== Career ==
After leaving school because of financial constraints, Kabanda became a political commentator through call-in programmes on Heart FM in Mubende, Radio Buddu in Masaka, CBS FM, and Radio Mbabule in Sembabule. His radio commentary attracted the attention of former Mawoggola County MP Sam Kutesa, who recruited him to work at Mbabule FM. There, Kabanda received training in radio operations and later served as the station manager while completing his secondary education.

In the 2021 general elections, Daudi Kabanda contested for the Kasambya County parliamentary seat in Mubende District on the National Resistance Movement (NRM) ticket. He was elected as the Member of Parliament for Kasambya County and joined Uganda's 11th Parliament (2021–2026).

Kabanda joined the MK Movement in April 2022. On 12 January 2023, he was appointed as the deputy spokesperson for the movement in Buganda. On 26 March 2023, he was appointed as the deputy spokesperson of the MK Movement at the national level. Following the transformation of the MK Movement into the Patriotic League of Uganda (PLU) on 7 February 2024, he was appointed as the organisation's Secretary General.

However, on 15 June 2026, Kabanda was replaced as secretary general of the Patriotic League of Uganda (PLU) during a change in leadership and was succeeded by Fadil Twalla. He remained a member of the PLU Central Committee and was later appointed Head of the Chairman's Office of PLU on 27 June 2026. In the 2026 general elections, Kabanda was re-elected to serve as the Member of Parliament for Kasambya County, Mubende District, in Uganda's 12th Parliament (2026–2031).

== See also ==
- Muhoozi Kainerugaba
- Jacob Marksons Oboth
- Frank Gashumba
