= Bala Bala Sese =

- Directed by: Lukyamuzi Bashir
- Screenplay by: Usama Mukwaya
- Produced by: Usama Mukwaya; Lukyamuzi Bashir
- Starring: Michael Kasaija; Natasha Sinayobye; Raymond Rushabiro; Ashraf Ssemwogerere; Ismael Ssesanga; Jabal Ddungu; Allen Musumba; Fiona Birungi
- Cinematography: Alex Ireeta
- Music by: Nessim Mukuza
- Production company: Badi World
- Distributed by: Côte Ouest Audiovisuel; JAMO Film Distributions
- Release date: 3 July 2015 (Theatre Labonita)
- Running time: 102 minutes
- Country: Uganda
- Language: Luganda

Bala Bala Sese is a Ugandan film directed by Lukyamuzi Bashir based upon a screenplay by Usama Mukwaya, starring Michael Kasaija, Natasha Sinayobye, Raymond Rushabiro, Ismael Ssesanga, Fiona Birungi, Ashraf Ssemwogerere and Ddungu Jabal. It is the director's, writer's and producers' debut feature film.

== Plot ==
The film tells of a boyfriend's battle for love through perseverance. In the outskirts of Sese Island, John (Michael Kasaija) is madly in love with Maggie (Natasha Sinayobye), and both are willing to take their love forward. Facing abuse and harassment by malicious Maggie’s father Kasirivu (Raymond Rushabiro), John, helped by his young brother Alex (Ssesanga Ismael), is determined to retain the love of his life, especially when he finds out that he has a contender village tycoon (Jabal Dungu) who is also lining up for Maggie.

== Cast ==
- Michael Kasaija as John
- Natasha Sinayobye as Maggie
- Raymond Rushabiro as Kasiriivu
- Ashraf Ssemwogerere as Ireene
- Fiona Birungi as Elena
- Ismael Ssesanga as Alex
- Ddungu Jabal as Zeus
- Allen Musumba as Nanziri
- Andrew Kizito as Siim

== Production ==
=== Filming ===
Principal photography on Bala Bala Sese began in late 2012 and wrapped in 2014. The movie was filmed on the Ssese Islands in Uganda, from which it takes its name.

== Release ==
The film was released on 3 July 2015 at theatre Labonita.

Bala Bala Sese is rather the first Ugandan project to receive a professional marketing approach. It was one of the top local productions of that year and the following year.

It was nominated at the 12th Africa Movie Academy Awards for Best Film in an African Language. It held its African premiere at the Luxor African Film Festival in Egypt and competed in the long Narrative category among 13 other African films. It was the opening film at the 10 Amakula International Film Festival and automatically qualified for the Golden Impala Award for best African film, which was won by De Noir.

=== Music and soundtrack ===
The soundtrack album was composed by Nessim (music producer), with the official theme song "Wuuyo" recorded by A Pass and Nessim again of Badi Musik. This became the singer's most successful single to date. The official video of the song premiered on 20 March 2015 at Club Guvnor and features clips from the movie.

== Awards ==
=== Nominated ===
- 2016: Long Narrative, Luxor African Film Festival
- 2016: Golden Impala Award, Amakula International Film Festival
- 2016: Best Film in an African Language, 12th Africa Movie Academy Awards
- 2016: Helsinki African Film Festival Jury Award for Human Rights and Social Commentary
- 2016: Best Feature Film, Africa International Film Festival

The film was also named as one of the best films of 2015 and 2016 by various critics.

- 4th – Anicee Gohar, Scoop Empire
- 4th – Elizabeth Mcsheffrey, British Airways, Highlife
- 1st – Douglas Sebamala, Monitor Uganda
