= A Pass =

Ugandan musician and songwriter

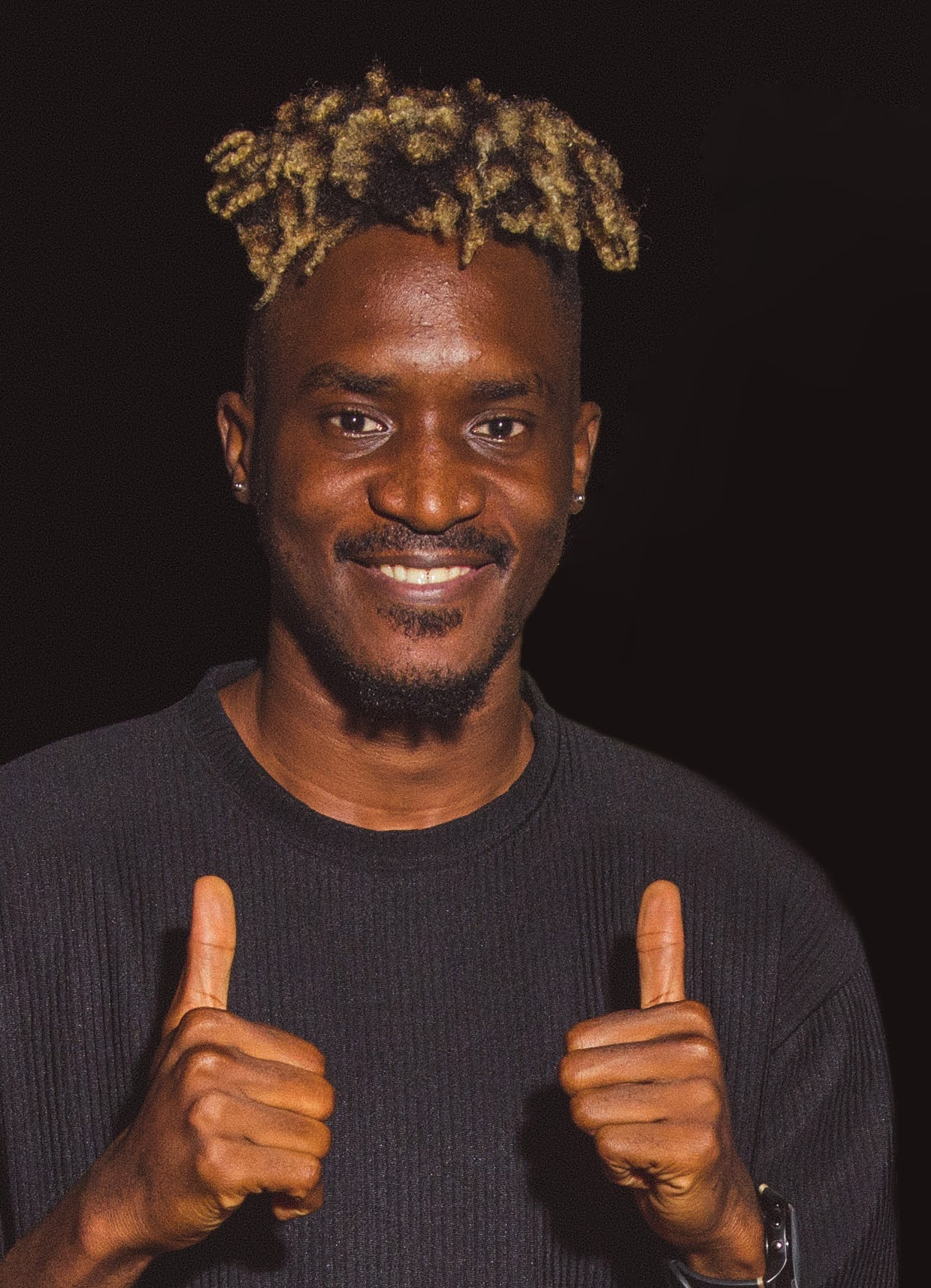

Background information
- Born: Bagonza Alexander; 21 December 1989 (age 36); Mengo, Uganda
- Genres: Dancehall, Afro, Reggae
- Occupation: Musician
- Years active: 2011 – present
- Label: Iamapass Records
- Website: iamapass.com

Alexander Bagonza, better known by his stage name A Pass (and formerly APassKiller), is a Ugandan musician and songwriter. He was born in Uganda on 21 December 1989. A Pass states that his stage name comes from Alexander his first name and Pass from his picky nickname Percy.

== Early life and education ==
A Pass was born on 21 December 1989 and is a second born in a family of seven. He attended Kampala Kindergarten for his nursery school, Nakasero Primary School for his primary, Merryland High Schools, and St Lawrence, Cream land for secondary school.

== Music career ==
A Pass started music as any normal church goer but he developed his talent more at school. He later went to studio in 2003 for his first studio session but he didn't record the song but only managed to get an instrumental. A Pass later on returned to studio after a few years when he met a friend called Eddy who encouraged him to sing more professionally. A Pass formed a strong musical relationship with Dave Dash who by then was known as A Dash and the two did a couple of songs together.

In 2011, he met video director Lukyamuzi Bashir who noticed his talent at South Syde in a studio session. Bashir began taking him to various studios around the country and introducing him to different influential people in the music industry. In 2012, BADI built a recording studio in Makindye called Badi Musik Production. BADI went on to shoot videos for A Pass in 2013, which added a steady kick-off to his career. A Pass is currently signed to and managed by LLolypop Entertainment.

A Pass has worked with a number of producers in the Reggae and Dancehall genre including Alex from Jamaica (A.I.P), Black Spyda from Jamaica, Nessim (Badi Musik), Baru (DustVille), Timo (Badi Musik), Just Jose (Swangz Avenue), Benon Mugumbya, (Swangz Avenue), Nash (Swangz Avenue), the Late Mac Elvis (South Syde), Keyner (K Records), Samurae (Talent 256), Don (DustVille) and several others. A Pass states he gets inspiration from music including dancehall, reggae, Rnb, hip hop and afro pop from artistes like Michael Jackson, Lucky Dube, UB40 among others.

A Pass has collaborated with various musicians including, A.Y. (musician), Goodlyfe from Uganda and Cinderella Sanyu among others. A Pass has written songs for Bebe Cool and co-written 'Love I Feel' with Michael Ross. He released a single Wuuyo, which became the official soundtrack to a Ugandan movie, Bala Bala Sese produced by Usama Mukwaya. A pass is commonly known to work with friend and producer Nessim and video producer Lukyamuzi Bashir under the record label Badi Musik.

=== Maiden Concert ===
On January 31, 2025, A Pass held his first solo concert, A Pass Live in Concert, at the Kampala Serena Hotel. The event featured a live performance of his notable songs and was attended by fellow musicians.Preparation began in late 2024, with rehearsals involving a live band. The concert was supported by corporate sponsors and received positive audience feedback.

== Discography ==
=== Music albums ===
- Nva Kampala (2016)
- African Yayo (2018)
- Bagonza (2024)
- A Pass (2025)
- Miracles (2026)

=== Singles ===
Some of A Pass's most popular songs include the following:

- Didadada
- Love Infection
- Am loving
- Am lovin Remix
- Tulikubigere
- KLA
- Mumpulila
- So loud
- Burn OP
- Nyenya Omugongo
- Run Bou Ya
- One Of A Kind
- Bartender
- Tetubatya
- Wuuyo
- Muliwa (we deyah)
- So High
- Wyne on Time
- Yuh Don Know Mi
- Take Time Off
- Abantu
- Sida Mukyalo

=== Collaborations ===
- Nah normal with Radio & Weasel
- Am Loving with Don Mc and Cinderella Sanyu
- My Flair with Patrobas
- Amatu Maggale with Tasha Batabazi
- AIP Cyber with A.I.P
- Take Time off with The Mith
- Trouble Maker with Ekky
- Memories with Lillian Mbabazi
- GAMULULU REMIX Ft Konshens
- Face Me with Azawi

== Feud ==
There has been unending feud between A Pass and other musicians in Uganda.

- Feud with Bebe Cool

== See also ==
- List of Ugandan musicians
