= Frank Gashumba =

Ugandan businessman

- Born: Frank Malingumu Gashumba; December 3, 1974 (age 51); Villa Maria, Masaka District, Uganda
- Citizenship: Ugandan
- Education: Nkumba University
- Occupations: Chairman of the Mali Group of Companies, Founder of Sisimuka Uganda, Vice Chairman for the Central Region of the Patriotic League of Uganda (PLU)
- Years active: 2000s–present
- Spouse: Patience Mutoni Malaika
- Children: 2
- Awards: African Public Service Optimum (APSO) Award (2023)

Frank Malingumu Gashumba (born 3 December 1974) is a Ugandan entrepreneur, motivational speaker, civil and economic rights activist. Gashumba serves as chairman of the Mali Group of Companies and is the founder of Sisimuka Uganda, an initiative promoting social development. Gashumba is known for his advocacy work on behalf of the Banyarwanda community in Uganda through the Council for Abavandimwe and holds the position of Vice Chairman for the Central Region of the Patriotic League of Uganda(PLU).His statements have generated public debate both in his advocacy efforts and commentary on political and social issues.

== Early life and education ==
Gashumba was born on 3 December 1974 in Villa Maria, Masaka District, Uganda, to Anthony 'Antonio' Kasumba and Cissy Mukarubayiza, both of Rwandan origin. His father was a landowner in Buganda and a businessman. He spent most of his childhood in Masaka and later in the early 90's moved to Kampala.

He attended St. Francis Primary School, before moving to Aga Khan Senior Secondary both in Masaka and later graduated from Nkumba University with a degree in Business Administration.

== Career ==
=== Business ===
Gashumba chairs the Mali Group of Companies, which has interests in agriculture, skills services, and tourism. He began his business activities in the late 1990s with ventures including Mali Mixed Farm.

=== Activism and advocacy ===
Gashumba has been a prominent advocate for Ugandans of Rwandan descent, known as the Banyarwanda. He co-founded the Council for Abavandimwe, an organization representing the interests of the Banyarwanda community in Uganda and abroad. Through this platform, he has campaigned for citizenship rights and recognition, contributing to executive interventions that addressed discrimination in national documentation processes.

He has organised cultural events such as the Abavandimwe Carnival, which promotes unity within the community and has featured performances by Ugandan artists including Eddy Kenzo, Cindy Sanyu, Jose Chameleon, Sheebah, Ray G, and Omega 256.

Gashumba founded Sisimuka Uganda (National Action for Awakening Uganda), an initiative focused on promoting mindset change, empowerment, and social development.

As Vice Chairman for the Central Region of the Patriotic League of Uganda (PLU), Gashumba has engaged in political mobilization and frequently addressed issues affecting the Banyarwanda community, positioning himself as a voice for marginalized groups.

=== Media and public engagement ===
Gashumba has appeared in media discussions on Ugandan politics and social issues. He has participated in public forums and hosted interviews covering topics related to the Banyarwanda community and national politics. He recently got embroiled with Pators in Uganda concerning miracles

== Legal issues and public scrutiny ==
Gashumba has been involved in legal proceedings.

In October 2017, he was arrested by the Chieftaincy of Military Intelligence (CMI) on charges including impersonation, forgery, conspiracy to commit a felony, and unlawful possession of narcotic drugs. The charges stemmed from allegations that he and an associate posed as Ministry of Defense officials in connection with a deal involving military trucks. Gashumba denied the accusations, asserting they were politically motivated. After two years of legal proceedings during which the prosecution failed to produce witnesses, Buganda Road Court dismissed all charges in November 2019.

Separately, in 2011 and in January 2021, Gashumba was implicated in fraud allegations related to a deal for fire tenders involving a Turkish company. He was arrested alongside others in the 2021 case but maintained his innocence. These cases did not result in convictions, and Gashumba subsequently continued his business and advocacy work.

Gashumba's political commentary has also drawn scrutiny, with some critics questioning shifts in his positions over time. He has responded to such criticism by emphasizing his commitment to community empowerment and national unity.

== Personal life ==
Gashumba is the father of media personality Sheilah Gashumba. He has been involved in philanthropic activities, including providing support for education and livelihood to burn victim Aisha Nabukeera. In May 2025, he held a traditional ceremony (gusaba) with partner Patience Mutoni Malaika.

== Awards and recognition ==
Gashumba received an African Public Service Optimum Award in 2023.

== See also ==
David Kabanda
