= Doreck Ankunda =

Ugandan actress and advocate

- Citizenship: Uganda
- Occupation: Actress

Doreck Ankunda is a Ugandan actress, disability inclusion advocate, and team leader at Wings of Hope. In 2024, she won the Best Actress award at the Bayelsa International Film Festival in Nigeria for her role in the film When You Become Me.

== Biography ==
Doreck Ankunda was born and raised in Uganda. She subsequently lost her hearing and became involved in advocating for the rights of individuals with disabilities, leading her to become actively involved in disability inclusion initiatives, particularly in the arts. She credits her family, friends, and mentors with supporting her throughout her career. Her role in When You Become Me, a film addressing discrimination, relationships, and self-doubt through the experiences of an editorial assistant with a disability, earned her acclaim. The film, written by Aganza Kisaka and Ambrose Ngobi; directed by Mathew Nabwiso; and produced by Reach a Hand Uganda, Light for the World, and Sauti Plus Media Hub; tackles social issues including empathy, identity, and the challenges faced by people with disabilities.

== Advocacy ==
In interviews, she emphasized the importance of African cinema sharing stories from underrepresented communities and that cinema has the power to challenge societal stereotypes and promote inclusivity. By showcasing diverse experiences and perspectives, she hopes to encourage filmmakers and audiences to recognize the potential of individuals with disabilities and support more inclusive practices within the industry. In November 2024, she expressed excitement about leading initiatives in the future to provide more opportunities for young people with disabilities to engage in the arts and inspire future generations.
