= Ashraf Ssemwogerere =

Ugandan director

Ashiraf Ssemwogerere
- Born: Kampala, Uganda
- Occupations: Screenwriter, director, actor, stage actor
- Years active: 1980–present
- Notable work: The Honourable
- Website: www.ashirafssemwogerere.com

Ashraf Ssemwogerere (or Semwogerere) is a Ugandan film actor, director and stage actor.

== Career and Kidnapping ==
He rose to fame with his movie Mukajanga ("The passion of the Ugandan Martyrs"), a story about the group of Buganda royals who were killed for their Christian faith by the Kabaka Mwanga II of Buganda. Semwogerere was kidnapped in Kinawataka by unidentified people in 2006, after screening his new play Murder in the City at the National Theatre. His movie Feeling Struggle is believed to be the first feature film in Uganda.

His other films include The Honourable and Murder in the City, a story based on Aggrey Kiyingi upon the murder of his wife, Robinah Kiyingi.

Ashraf features in Lukyamuzi Bashir's movie Bala Bala Sese as Ireene.
