= Patrick Ssenjovu =

Ugandan actor

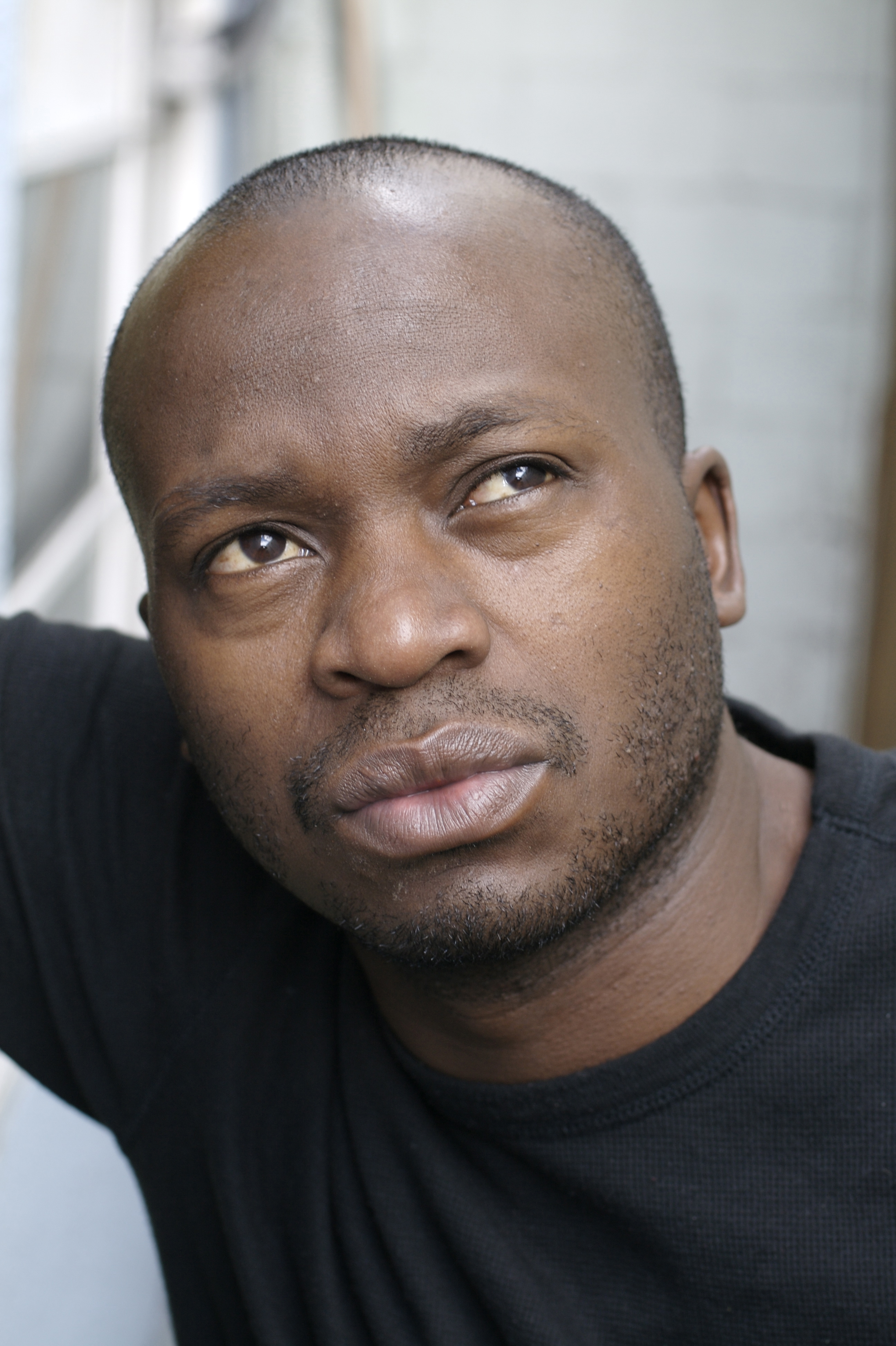
- Ssenjovu in 2008.
- Born: Kayunga, Uganda
- Occupations: Actor, film director and film producer

Patrick Ssenjovu is a film and theatre actor, and a film director and producer.

== Career ==
=== Theatre work ===
At age fourteen Ssenjovu became the youngest member of Impact International, a dance and theatre troupe, performing throughout Europe and the United States, including Woza Albert!, a political-satire play.

He then moved to New York City, where he became a member of the Great Jones Repertory Company and worked with such people as Meredith Monk, Ellen Stewart, Ping Chong and Seth Barish. Ssenjovu has performed at venues including La MaMa Experimental Theatre Club, Lincoln Center, the Ohio Theatre and the St. Anne's Warehouse, all located in New York City; and the New Jersey Performing Arts Center, located in Newark, New Jersey.

In 2000, he appeared as himself in Secret History, a theatre piece written and directed by Chong, at the Ohio Theatre.

=== Film and video-game acting ===
Ssenjovu appeared as Ibrahim Moshoeshoe in Game 6 (2005), a sport, comedy-drama film directed by Michael Hoffman; and The Interpreter (2005), a mystery-thriller, drama film directed by Sydney Pollack.

Ssenjovu voice acted multiple characters in X-Men Origins: Wolverine (2009), a science-fiction, fantasy-action video game.

=== Film producing and directing ===
Ssenjovu produced and directed Awaken (2009), a short drama film.

== See also ==
- Ugandan Americans
