= Gravity Omutujju =

Ugandan Music Artist and Singer

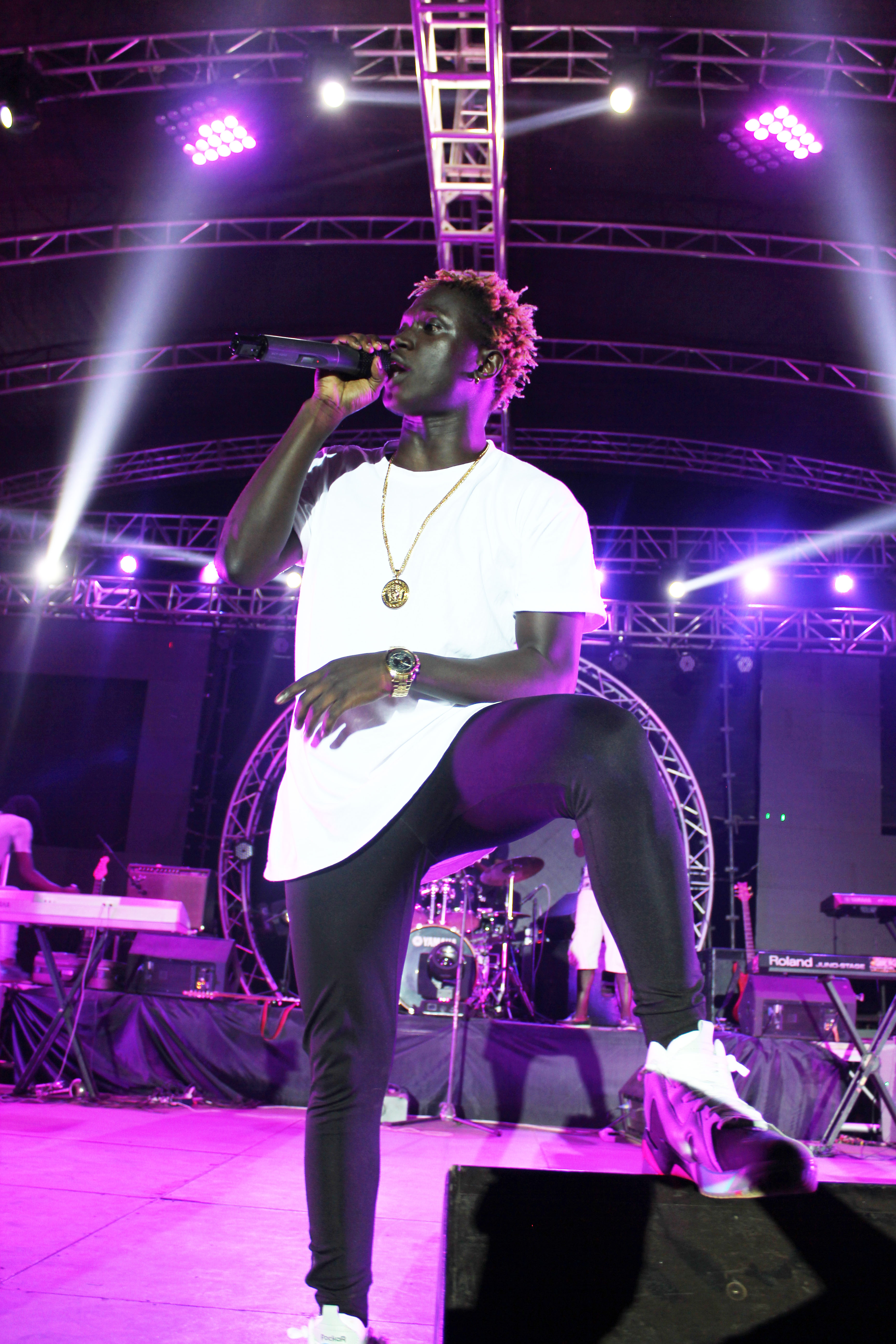
- Born: Gereson Wabuyi; 1993 (age 32–33); Uganda
- Citizenship: Uganda
- Occupation: Musician
- Known for: Music
- Other political affiliations: National Resistance Movement

Gereson Wabuyi, known professionally as Gravity Omutujju, is a Ugandan singer. He has collaborated with numerous other Ugandan musicians, including Eddy Kenzo.

== Early life and education ==
Gereson Wabuyi was born in 1995 in Nakulabye.

== Career ==
Wabuyi started singing as a student at Old Kampala Secondary School, where he adopted 'Gravity Omutujju' as his stage name. At the age of 17, he signed with Redemption Studios, where he recorded his first song, "Joanita".

He later joined producer Didi in Born Fire, a Makindye-based group, where he connected with other artists with whom he has collaborated. He has received media attention for his criticisms of other musicians.

== Discography ==
  - Walumbe zaya, 2011
  - Omwooto, 2015
  - Broken English, 2016
  - Ekyakuzala, 2019
  - Embuzi zakutidde, 2018
  - Omusomesa, 2015
  - Joanita, 2013
  - Kappa yo, 2019
  - Balance the boat, 2018
  - Towakana, 2015
  - Teri dogo, 2014
  - Hits, 2015
  - Tunyumize, 2016
  - Bitandise, 2020
  - Nyabo, 2020
  - Abanyampi, 2019
  - Wakulemye, 2015
  - Ampalana, 2018
  - Malangajja, 2013

== Awards and recognition ==
- Winner - Teeniez Breakout Artist 2013
- Winner - Best Hip Hop Song at the HiPipo Music Awards 2013
- Buzz Tenniez awards – breakthrough artist of the year, 2013
- Hipipo music awards – Hip hop song of the year, 2013
- MTN hip hop awards – most downloaded song, 2016
- MTN hip hop awards – best rapper central, 2019

== Nominations ==
- Nominated - Best Hip Hop song at the HiPipo Music Awards 2014
- Nominated - Best Munyole musician in East Africa
