= Leila Nakabira =

Ugandan actress, screenwriter, women activist (born 1993)

- Born: 1993 (age 32–33); Uganda
- Other name: Leilah Nakabira
- Education: Makerere University, Kampala
- Occupations: Actress; Scriptwriter; Women activist
- Known for: The Forbidden (2018)
- Awards: Best Actress, TIFf 2019

Leila Nakabira, also Leilah Nakabira (born 1993) is a Ugandan actress, screenwriter and women activist. She is the CEO of Lepa Africa Films and Founder of Leilah Nakabira For Charity Foundation.

== Education ==
Nakabira studied Quantitative Economics in Makerere University, Kampala, Uganda, where she graduated. After some time in the film industry, she decided to go back to study filmmaking.

== Career ==
She received a triple nomination for the Best Golden Actress (Drama), Golden Most Promising Actor and Golden Discovery Actor award categories at the 2018 Golden Movie Awards Africa (GMAA) held on June 2, with nominees' names called in Palaise de la culture, Treichville, Abidjan, Côte d'Ivoire, for the film she was starred in, titled The Forbidden, produced by Nampala Claire. At the Zulu Africa Film Academy Awards (ZAFAA) 2018, she got nominated in the Best Actor Female category for the same film. She was nominated and won the Best Actress award in the UDADA Women's Film Festival awards held on October 20, 2018, in Kenya for the same film. She was again nominated in the Best Actress category at The African Film Festival (TAFF) Awards 2019, for the same film. The event was held on June 30 at The Moody Performance Hall, 2520 Flora Street, Dallas, Texas, United States. For yet the same film, in the Lake International Film Festival (LIPFF) Awards held November 6–9, 2019 in Kenya, she was nominated for two award categories: Best Child Performer and Best Actress.

In the 2019 Africa Women's Day, she advised women to be fearless in the pursuit of their goals.

== Filmography ==
Year	Film	Role	Notes	Ref.
2018	The Forbidden	Actress		

== Accolades ==
Year	Event	Prize	Recipient	Result
2018	GMAA	Best Golden Actress	Herself	Nominated
2018	GMAA	Golden Most Promising Actor	Herself	Nominated
2018	GMAA	Golden Discovery Actor	Herself	Nominated
2018	UDADA WFF	Best Actress	Herself	Won
2018	ZAFAA	Best Actress	Herself	Nominated
2019	TIFF	Best Actress	Herself	Won
2019	LIPFF	Best Actress	Herself	Nominated
2019	LIPFF	Best Child Performer	Herself	Nominated
