= Fauziah Nakiboneka =

Ugandan actress (born 1977)

- Born: Fauziah Nakiboneka; 15 May 1977 (age 48); Kampala, Uganda
- Education: Kampala International University (B.A Mass Com)
- Occupations: Actress; Singer; dancer
- Years active: 1999–present

Fauziah Nakiboneka (born 15 May 1977) is a Ugandan actress, singer, dancer and humanitarian. She is a lead actress in The Ebonies, one of Uganda's most successful and oldest stage drama groups.

== Early life ==
Fauziah aka Fuzzy was born in Kyaddondo to Hajji Abdul Bbosa and Hajjat Zuriat Bbosa of Masajja.

She went to school to Victoria Kindergarten, Maim Street Primary School Jinja, Najjanankumbi YCS, Aga Khan High School and Kampala International University.

== Acting career ==
Fauzia joined the theatre industry through The Ebonies in 1999, during her senior six vacation. She has starred in numerous acclaimed shows including That's Life Mwattu, Kyeeko and currently in OMG as the Sarah Gava. In 2014, Fauziah put on her debut solo show titled Who is Fauziah Nakiboneka, that became the most successful show under the Screen-Night Ebonies' actors' segment.

Nakiboneka again exhibited a stage show dubbed the Sarah Gava Extravaganza Show on 21 November 2019 at Theatre Labonita while singing, dancing with choreography. She was joined by her artist friends Ykee Benda, Harriet Nalubwama (Nakawunde), Gravity Omutujju, Levixone, Halima Namakula, Patriko, Cindy Sanyu, The Ebonies Akaalo Band among others.

== Ebonies ==
Fauziah has been part of the Ebonies since her teenage. The Ebonies is one of Uganda's most successful and oldest stage drama group, started in 1977 with over three decades of entertaining Ugandans and the rest of the world.

Apart from their time-tested TV series such as That's Life Mwattu, Bibaawo; These Things Happen, Kyekyo, Life Kyeki and more recently, OMG. The Ebonies have over the last 35 years composed some of the most successful songs in the history of Ugandan music. Songs like Twalina Omukwano negufa, Munyambe Ntukeyo - are all original Ebonies' compositions.

== Singing career ==
Fauziah has worked on various songs both as a singer and songwriter. Some of the songs include Salary, Just A Woman and Together for Her. Most of Fauziah's songs are centered around advocacy for the girl child education and rights and women empowerment.

In 2016, she was commissioned by Plan International to record a song about the girl child titled Together for Her produced by Nessim at Badi World.

== Charity works ==
Fauziah has been supporting the Missionaries of the Poor Good Shepherd Home in Mengo Kisenyi and Father Raymond Kids Home in Kabowa for almost 10 years now. The backing has been through scholastic and financial donations.

Fauziah also personally supports two children Kizito 19 (age) since 2014 and Diana 8 (age) since nursery school.

=== Fauziah Nakiboneka Education Bursary ===
Supported by London College Nansana, Fauziah donates school bursaries to 20 secondary student every year to exceptional students in the field of cocurricular activities. The partnership began after her debut screen night show in 2014.

== Personal life ==
Fauzia was previously married to fellow The Ebonies actor Ronnie whom she met while working on the stage play 'Daisy'. The two welcomed a daughter together in 2003.
