= Tembele =

- Film poster
- Directed by: Morris Mugisha
- Written by: Morris Mugisha; Ninsiima Ronah
- Produced by: Morris Mugisha; Ekuka Izaek
- Starring: Patriq Nkakalukanyi; Ninsiima Ronah; Cosmas Sserubogo
- Cinematography: Ekuka Izaek; Fauzia Mulimira
- Edited by: Kimera Paul
- Production company: Moideas
- Release date: 7 August 2022
- Running time: 90 mins
- Country: Uganda

Tembele is a 2022 Ugandan mental health drama directed by Morris Mugisha. It is Uganda's first-ever submission to the Academy Award Best International Feature category.

== Synopsis ==
Set in Kampala, the film centers around Tembele, a garbage collector, who works 12 hour shifts. Tembele and his wife, Mawa, are expecting their first child together. When the child dies soon after birth, Tembele has a mental breakdown and is in complete denial that his son has died. The next day he returns to work happy while everyone else is mourning.

== Cast ==
- Patriq Nkakalukanyi as Tembele
- Ninsiima Ronah as Mawe
- Cosmas Sserubogo as Segi
- Jackie Chebet as Tembele's Mother
- Chemonge as Young Tembele
- Najuma Fatuma as Nurse
- Oleru Oliver as Goloba's Wife
- Ssentongo Sinani as Goloba
- Asiimwe Vivian as Physchiatrist
- Sarah Mpagi as Hotel Receptionist
- Mzee Luverenge as Tembele's Father

== Reception and awards ==
Tembele won Best Film, Best Actor and Best Supporting Actor honors at the 2022 Uganda Film Festival Awards and Best Achievement in Cinematography at the 2022 Africa Movie Academy Awards. The 10 AMAA nominations categories it was nominated for included Best Film in an African Language, Best Achievement in Costume Design, Best Achievement in Sound Track, Best Achievement in Sound, Best Achievement in Cinematography, Achievement in Screenplay, Best Actor in a Leading Role, Best Actress in a Leading Role, Best Director and Best Film.

In September 2022, it was selected by the Uganda Academy Selection Committee (UASC) to represent Uganda at the 95th Academy Awards in the Best International Feature Film category, winning over Nalwawo by Erik Emokor and November Tear by Richard Nondo.
