= Aganza Kisaka =

Ugandan actress and poet

Aganza Kisaka is a Ugandan actress, producer, director playwright, and poet.

== Education and career ==
Raised in Kampala, she trained as an actress at New York University Abu Dhabi and earned a Masters in Education from Unicaf University.

After completing her undergraduate studies, she returned to Uganda, where she faced challenges such as low pay and initial industry struggles. Aganza taught drama at an international school. Her commitment to theatre deepened with her involvement in projects like the 10th Berlin Biennale and 27 Guns film. Aganza aims to elevate theatre in Uganda, making it more popular among youth and improving the industry’s work environment. She believes in creating opportunities for Ugandan talent to thrive locally, without needing to go abroad.

Aganza has won Best Actress at the PIFF Awards and Best Supporting Actress at the UFF Awards. She is also a published author, with her short story on depression, “Operation: Mother’s Bruises,” featured in The Different Shades of the Feminine Mind (2017). As a playwright, her debut Black (2016) explores themes of race and identity. Aganza founded the Yenze Theatre Conservatoire to train performing artists and provide production services in Kampala. Her work focuses on identity, belonging, and the power of storytelling to foster connection and healing.

== Projects ==
Kisaka made her mark as a playwright at the Kampala International Theatre Festival in 2016 with her debut play "Black," addressing critical issues of race, blackness, and identity. Her subsequent work, "Killing Time," was featured in multiple prestigious festivals, including the Lagos Theatre Festival, Kenya International Theatre Festival, and Kampala International Theatre Festival in 2021. Further, her short film "Vanilla" garnered nominations at both the Berlin International Art Film Festival in 2021 and the Toronto Black Film Festival in 2022.

Kisaka has produced "The Betrothal" by Joshua Mmali and "Red Hills" by Asiimwe Deborah Kawe, and played a key role in the Kampala International Theatre Festival in 2019. Her directorial pursuits include serving as assistant director for "The Merchant of Venice" and helming the acclaimed production of the musical "My Fair Lady" in Kampala. Kisaka is the founder of Yenze Theatre Conservatoire (YTC), which offers training in acting, movement, and voice while also providing artist management and production services for local talent in Kampala.

== See also ==
- Anne Kansiime
- Sheila Gashumba
- Diana Nabatanzi
