= Sam Gombya =

- Born: Uganda
- Occupation: musician

Sam Gombya is a Ugandan musician, radio presenter and social activist. He has taken part in the campaign against tobacco. He is married to fellow musician Sophie Gombya.

== Early life and education ==
Sam Gombya went to Nabagereka Primary School and then to Seven Hills Secondary School. He is radio presenter at Dembe Fm in Kampala.

== Music ==
Sam Gombya sings in bass. He is known for his song "Sebo Muko", which he performs with his wife. He has six albums with his wife.

== Discography ==
=== Songs ===
- Sebo Muko
- Lujja Lumu
- Gyangu gyendi
- Lugya Lumu
- Ebbuba
- Okyaaye
- Saala Zange

=== Albums with Sophie Gombya ===
- Nkwesize Mu Bbuba
