= Arthur Kisenyi =

Ugandan actor, singer and musician (born 1990)

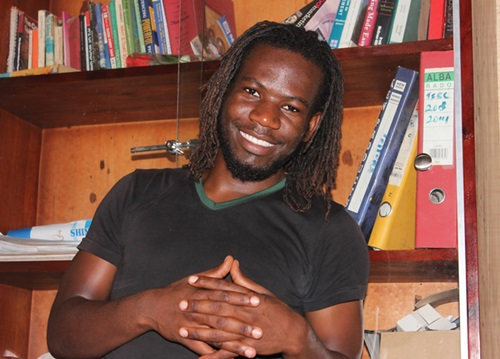
- Kisenyi in 2016
- Born: 10 January 1990 (age 36)
- Education: Makerere University
- Occupations: Actor, Director, Producer, Singer
- Years active: 2007-present

Arthur Kisenyi (born 1990) is a Ugandan actor, singer and musician. He started professional acting in 2007 with Strange News, a project by Norwegian music composer Rolf Wallin and Belgian Director Josse dePauw about child soldiers in Africa.

Arthur plays the former child soldier in Rolf Wallin and Josse De Pauw's Strange News, a large multimedia work including symphony orchestra, video and surround sound.

== Early life and education ==
Born and raised in the Ugandan capital, he won the role among 90 young men in a local audition at the age of 16. Shortly after he left for Oslo, where Josse De Pauw created the role especially for him. He has – since the premiere with Oslo Philharmonic Orchestra in 2007– performed Strange News in a number of cities, among them Porto and Chicago, Toronto, Brussels, Amsterdam, Stavanger, Birmingham, London among others.

He studied drama at the Performing Arts and Film Department Makerere University where his research was about the 'General Public's perception of Theatre Artistes' with Bakayimbira Drama actors as his case study. In his final year, he was selected the best play director with his directing project of Nikolai Gogol’s ‘Marriage’ He was in 2012 contracted by Sharing Youth Centre Nsambya on behalf of the white fathers to direct the play 'Loud Silence' which handled Child labor, child trafficking and sex enslavement. He later on showed the same play at Mbarara University of Science & Technology and Maryhill High School Mbarara.

== Work ==
He has directed and performed in Shakespeare's King Lear, Gogol's The Government Inspector and African plays Like Amanita, Betrayal in the city, Voice of the people, echoes of silence among others.
