= Fauziah Mohd Taib =

Malaysian diplomat and author (born 1955)

Yang Berbahagia Dato' Fauziah Mohd Taib DPTJ
- فوزيه محمد طائب
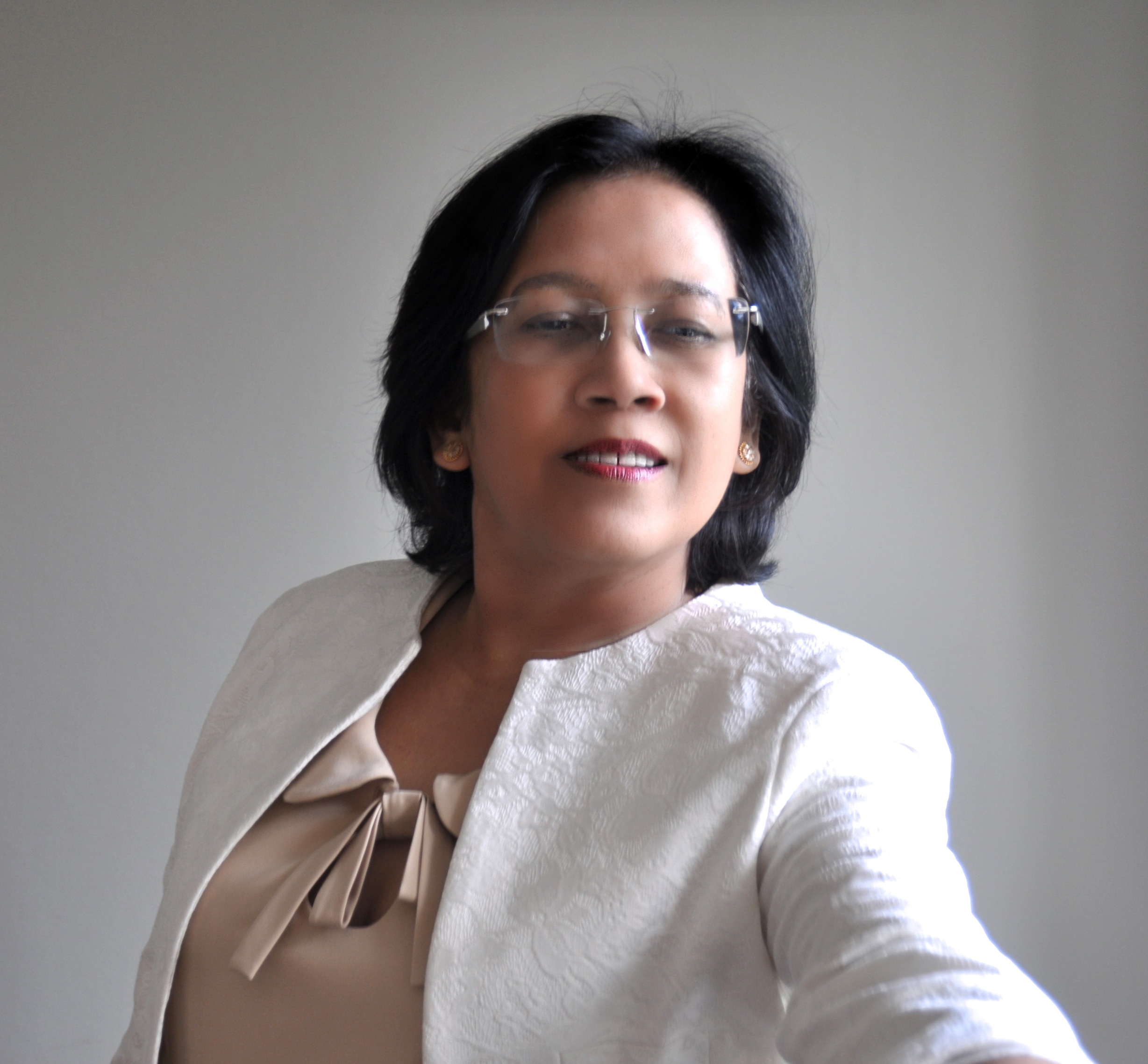
- Yang Berbahagia Dato' Fauziah Mohd Taib

12th Ambassador of Malaysia to the Kingdom of the Netherlands
- In office 13 August 2008 – 26 March 2015

Personal details
- Born: Fauziah binti Mohamad Taib
- Education: Universiti Malaya; Sorbonne; University of Kent

Fauziah Binti Mohamad Taib is a Malaysian diplomat and author who served as the Ambassador to the Kingdom of the Netherlands from 13 August 2008 until her retirement in 2015. During this period, she was also the Permanent Representative of Malaysia to the Organization for the Prohibition of Chemical Weapons (OPCW).

In 2005, the Ministry of Foreign Affairs (Malaysia) appointed Taib as the Director General of the Institute of Diplomacy and Foreign Relations (IDFR). Her tenure oversaw the introduction of updates to the diplomatic syllabus, incorporating simulations and discussions alongside traditional lectures. The institute took part in academic publishing activities and she also worked as a speechwriter for the Minister of Foreign Affairs.

As a Permanent Representative to the OPCW, Taib represented Malaysia during two Executive Council terms and co-facilitated discussions on the OPCW's inspection methodology. When the OPCW was awarded the 2013 Nobel Peace Prize, she attended the ceremony in Oslo.

While serving in the Netherlands, Taib began painting and held her first exhibition in The Hague in 2012. In 1977, during the summer of her graduation, she backpacked and trekked across the continent.

== Early life and education ==
She studied International Relations at the University of Malaya (1974–1977), l'Université de Paris 1 (Panthéon-Sorbonne) / L'Institut International d'Administration Publique, Paris (1985–1986), and the University of Kent at Canterbury (1994–1996). She completed a PhD in International Relations at the University of Kent at Canterbury after 18 months of study.

== Career ==
Returning to the Institute of Diplomacy and Foreign Relations (IDFR) as Director General, Taib revised the diplomatic training syllabus and oversaw the institute's publications.

As Director General of the newly established Policy and Strategy Planning division within the Ministry of Foreign Affairs, Fauziah participated in several government initiatives. She commissioned a paper for the Foreign Minister that advocated for the establishment of a dedicated legal department within the Ministry. This initiative ultimately led to the creation of the Ministry's Department of Research, Treaties, and International Law. Additionally, she was a member of the Malaysian delegation to the International Court of Justice in the legal dispute with Singapore over Pedra Branca, Middle Rocks, and South Ledge.

Taib's overseas postings included serving as Deputy Chief of Mission in Washington, D.C., and Ambassador to Fiji (with concurrent accreditation to Nauru, Tonga, Kiribati, and Tuvalu), before her assignment as Ambassador to the Netherlands.

=== Works ===
Taib has written and edited several books on diplomacy and international relations. Her first book, Malaysia and UNCED: An Analysis of a Diplomatic Process, was published by Kluwer Law International in 1989. Her other publications include Number One, Wisma Putra (a collection of short stories by Malaysian Ambassadors), and At the OPCW: A Story of Malaysia's Interventions, which was released in 2015.

=== MH17 Crisis Management ===
After the Malaysia Airlines MH17 crash on 17 July 2014, Taib was appointed as Malaysia's lead focal point, heading the Joint Operations Centre in The Hague to oversee the repatriation of victims. She was liaison with the Dutch government on matters related to the downed aircraft.

She was featured in interviews to several television stations in both the Netherlands and Malaysia during the MH17 crisis management operations in the Netherlands.

== Publications ==
=== Books ===
- Malaysia and UNCED: An Analysis of a Diplomatic Process: 1989 – 1992 (Kluwer Law International, 1997) ISBN 90-411-0683-9
- A Diplomat Arrives in Washington (USA, 2003) ISBN 1-4010-8915-1/-3
- Rumah Malaysia, Suva: The Official Residence of the High Commissioner (Fiji, 2004) ISBN 982-9093-01-8
- Selected Foreign Policy Speeches by Syed Hamid Albar (Editor) (Malaysia, 2005) ISBN 983-2220-07-6
- The Making of the ASEAN Summit (Malaysia, 2006) ISBN 983-2220-09-2
- Number One, Wisma Putra (Editor) (Malaysia, 2006) ISBN 983-2220-12-2/11-4
- Manual of Procedures for Wisma Putra Officers (Editor) (Malaysia, 2007)
- Letta, Corrado. Malaysia-Europe Strategic Partnership for the Pacific Century. Edited by Fauziah Mohd Taib (Malaysia, 2008) ISBN 978-983-43196-2-5
- Brushwork Odyssey in Malaysia: A Dutch Retelling (Editor) (Netherlands, 2009) ISBN 978-90-9024773-1
- Letta, Corrado. Integration Geopolitics: East Asia vs Latin America (Edited by Fauziah Mohd Taib) (Peru, 2010) ISBN 978-612-45771-0-9
- All Things Malaysian (Editor) (Netherlands, 2011) ISBN 978-90-9026098-3
- At the OPCW: A Story of Malaysia's Interventions (the Netherlands, 2015) ISBN 978-967-132420-2

=== Journal ===
- Journal of Diplomacy and Foreign Relations (JDFR Malaysia) – Editor-in-Chief, 2005–2007

=== Commemorative Magazine ===
- Wisma Putra @ 50: 1957–2007 – Editor-in-Chief

=== Articles / Papers ===
- "Creativity in Malaysia's Foreign Policy" in INTAN. 1989.
- "Ethics in Malaysia's Foreign Policy" in JDFR. 2006.
- "Privatising Diplomacy: The Way Forward," in Managing Diplomats’ Networks and Optimizing Value by Kishan Rana and Jova Kurbalija (DiploFoundation, Malta), 2007.
- "Malaysia's Foreign Policy After 2020: In Search of a Niche" (Paper presented at the 8th Heads of Missions Conference, Kuala Lumpur) 2014.

== Honours ==
=== Honours of Malaysia ===
- Negeri Sembilan
  - Knight Commander of the Grand Order of Tuanku Jaafar (DPTJ) – Dato' (2008)
