= Sam Bagenda =

Ugandan singer and actor (born 1965)

- Born: Sam Bagenda; 31 March 1965 (age 61); Mukono, Uganda
- Other name: Dr Bbosa
- Education: Lubiri Secondary School; Caltek Academy Makerere
- Alma mater: Makerere University
- Occupations: Singer, actor, director, producer
- Years active: 1985–present
- Parents: Sam Bakiranze (father); Margaret Bakiranze (mother)

Sam Bagenda, popularly known by his stage name Dr. Bbosa, (born 31 March 1965), is a prominent Ugandan actor and singer. Started his career as a singer, Bagenda later became a popular actor, who is best known for the roles in the Malayalam Movie Escape from Uganda and film That's Life Mwattu. Meanwhile, Bagenda was also voted Ugandan actor of the millennium in 2000.

== Personal life ==
He was born on 31 March 1965, in Mukono, Uganda, in a family with four siblings. His father Dr. Sam Bakiranze was a doctor and mother Margaret Bakiranze was a teacher. He started education from Auntie Clare and City Nursery schools. Later he attended Kitante Primary school and completed his secondary school at Lubiri Secondary School, Kampala and Caltek Academy Makerere. He later graduated with a Bachelor of Commerce with a bias in auditing from Makerere University. Meanwhile, he completed a Public Accountants course (CPA) at Graffins College Kenya as well. Then he worked as an accountant for few years before entering drama.

== Career ==
Bagenda started singing at Anglican Church Choir of St. Paul's Church in Mulago during young age. However, after parish priest fired him from the church, he was joined by other members from the church choir and formed a gospel choir Sun Rose-85 in 1985. In December 1986, he first joined The Ebonies and continued to work as a deep voiced singer, alongside the late Jimmy Katumba, they performed in several festivals and later produced the popular sweet ballad Twalina omukwano neguf. His first major performance was in January 1987 at the grand opening of the current Bat Valley theatre.

He made his first acting role as a 'priest' in the stage play The Dollar. When he was at the peak of his popularity as a singer, he met the playwright and director, J.W.K Ssembajwe. In 1993, he played the role 'Dr. Sam Bbosa' in the popular Ugandan television serial That's Life Mwattu. He became a sensation in the media after the series, where he was often known as 'Dr. Bbosa' among the locals.

== Filmography ==
Year	Film	Role	Genre	Ref.
1993	That's Life Mwattu	Dr. Sam Bbosa	film	
2013	Escape from Uganda	The Mayor	Malayalam Movie	
2022	Kyaddala	Mr. Otto	Family Drama	
2023	Maid of Honor	Milton Othieno	Mystery	
	Agony and Ecstasy			
	The Boss			
	Land Friends			
	Daisy			
	The Dollar			
	Dilemma			
	Bibaawo			
	OMG			
	Kyekyo			
