= Michael Kasaija =

Ugandan actor, dancer

- Born: Ugandan
- Education: Makerere University
- Occupations: Actor, dancer
- Years active: 2010–present
- Children: 1

Michael Kasajja is a Ugandan actor, model, choreographer and dancer. He debuted as a lead actor in the 2015 film Bala Bala Sese alongside his erstwhile girlfriend Natasha Sinayobye.

== Early life and education ==
Kasajja was raised in Kampala, Uganda and went to school at Busoga College Mwiri and at Caltec Academy. At Makerere University, he juggled a business administration degree with choreography for inter-hall competitions and variety shows.

== Career ==
Steve Jean continuously hired Kasajja after school to be his king dancer, an exposure that landed him to Pamela Basasirwaki, whom he started dating. As a member of The Obsessions Dance Group, Pamela introduced him to the group and he was taken on instantly. Then along came another dancer with the group, Natasha Sinayobye that saw Pamela no more in the picture but the two quit the group in 2005 starting their own dance group the KOMBAT Entertainment Ltd. Under Kombat, He achieved his major performance highlight at the opening ceremony for the CHOGM 52 heads of states conference in Uganda 2007. Michael recently landed himself a job as manager of the Ebonies drama group in plays Trials and Tribulations of Love, the ninth episode of the group's Romantic Night series. He was also one of the judges of NTV's Talent Xp alongside musicians, Isiah Katumwa, Jackie Chandiru and Bebe Cool.

== Personal life ==
Kasaijja has a son named Sean Mario. Beyond acting, dancing and choreography where he is commonly known he also served as the judge on the NTV reality show called Talent Xp with some musicians such as Isiah Katumwa and Bebe Cool.

He was also once a manager for the Ebonies theater group in some of their productions. He also worked with notable figures in the film industry such as Mukwaya Usama and Lukyamuzi Bashir.

He mostly became so famous in the movie called "Bala Bala Sese" in which he played a role as "John" or main character in the film.

== See also ==
- Morris Mugisha
- Housen Mushema
- Arnold Oceng
