= Natasha Sinayobye =

Ugandan actress

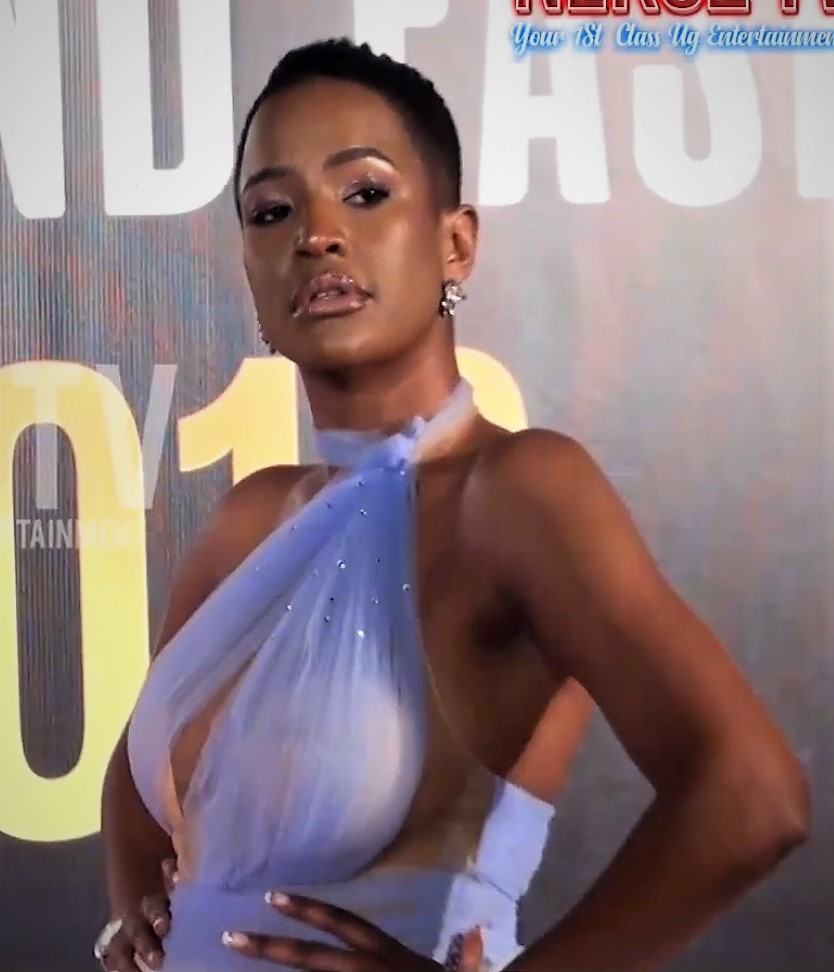
- Sinayobye posing at the Abryanz Style and Fashion Awards in 2019
- Born: Uganda
- Education: Agakhan; Aptech
- Occupations: Singer, actress, dancer
- Years active: 2010–present
- Known for: Bala Bala Sese; Beneath the Lies - The Series

Natasha Sinayobye (born 20 January) is a Ugandan actress, model, singer and dancer. She debuted as a lead actress in the Ugandan film Bala Bala Sese alongside her then-boyfriend Michael Kasaija. She acted as Kaitesi Munyana in Nana Kagga's TV series, Beneath The Lies - The Series.

== Early life ==
Sinayobye was raised in Kampala Uganda and attended school at St. Noah Primary, Balikkudembe Secondary School, Aga Khan High School and APTECH.

== Career ==
She was the second runner up at the Miss Uganda pageant and was crowned Miss MTN Uganda. She later modelled with the top-most modelling agency in Uganda, Zipper models. In 2011, she was voted as the most beautiful woman in Uganda by In2EastAfrica.

She then founded KOMBAT Entertainment Ltd. Under Kombat, she achieved her major performance highlight at the opening ceremony for the CHOGM 52 heads of states conference in Uganda 2007.

In 2009, with her boyfriend, she joined drama group The Ebonies.

In 2010, she began singing professionally. She has released two singles entitled "Butunda" and "Sikiya". Her video for "Butunda" won the most exceptional video in the 2011 Diva Awards.

== Filmography ==
=== Film ===
Year	Film	Role	Notes
2015	Bala Bala Sese	Maggie	Lead role, faces the wrath of John's love
2021	"Sisteen Rounds"	Dorothy	Short drama

=== TV series ===
Year	TV series	Role	Notes
2014	Beneath the Lies - The Series	Kaitesi Munyana	Created by Nana Kagga Macpherson
