= Shamim Murerwa =

Ugandan Musician (born 1999)

Shamim Murerwa born on (September 27, 1999) is a Ugandan musician also known by her stage name Omega 256, also referred to as the queen of the west. She is a songwriter and live performer artist.

== Career ==
Murerwa began her music career at the age of 17 and released her debut song, "Ninterwa," in 2018. She subsequently released additional songs, including "Weekend," "This Year," "Keeza," and "Deep in Love." She attended primary school at Shalom Keben, secondary school at Sentah College and later branched into her music career and has performed live music concerts in Kampala and major cities in Uganda. Her songs have a blend of reggae, afrobeat, and traditional Ugandan music, which is growing her fan base both locally and internationally.

== Early life ==
Murerwa grew up in Ankole, a region in western Uganda and lost her mother at the age of 5 years. She continued with education until her Senior 4 vacation, where she started recording her music studious and this marked the beginning of her music journey.

== See also ==
- Sheebah Karungi
- John Blaq
- Irene Ntale
