= Cindy Magara =

Ugandan filmmaker and academic

- Born: Cindy Evelyn Magara Amooti
- Education: Makerere University (BA; MA); University of Sydney (PhD)
- Occupations: Film director; academic

Cindy Evelyn Magara Amooti is a Ugandan film director and academic. She is a lecturer in film and literature at Makerere University. She has directed the feature films Fate (2006), Fair Play (2010) and Windows of Hope (2011), and the documentary series Tuko Pamoja (2024).

== Biography ==
Magara earned a Bachelor of Arts in Film and Literature and a Master of Arts in Literature from Makerere University, and later completed a PhD in African cinema at the University of Sydney. Her doctoral thesis is titled Contemporary East African Cinema: Emergent Themes and Aesthetics.

In 2006, Magara directed Fate, a drama film that premiered in Kampala in July 2006 and addressed the impact of HIV/AIDS. In 2024 she directed and executive produced Tuko Pamoja, a 13-part documentary series about Ugandan history and identity, which premiered in Kampala in February 2024 and screened through mid-2024. ChimpReports identified Magara as a judge at the Pearl International Film Festival in 2014.

== Selected filmography ==
| Year | Title | Role | Notes |
|---|---|---|---|
| 2006 | Fate | Director | Premiered in Kampala in July 2006. |
| 2010 | Fair Play | Director | |
| 2011 | Windows of Hope | Director | |
| 2024 | Tuko Pamoja | Director; executive producer | 13-part documentary series. |

== Selected publications ==
- Magara, Cindy E. (2018). "Imaging the Self: The Representation of Women in Mariam Ndagire's Films". In Nabutanyi, Edgar; Kahyana, Danson; Dipio, Dominica (eds.). Narrative, Agency and Subjectivity: Writing and Contemporary Eastern African Peripheral Subjectivities. Fountain Publishers. pp. 163–191.
- Magara, Cindy E. (2013). "The Concept of Heroism Among the Banyoro". In Dipio, Dominica; Sillars, Stuart (eds.). Performing Wisdom: Proverbial Lore in Modern Ugandan Society. Matatu. Vol. 42. pp. 21–36.
