= Sheilah Gashumba =

Ugandan media personality, TV host

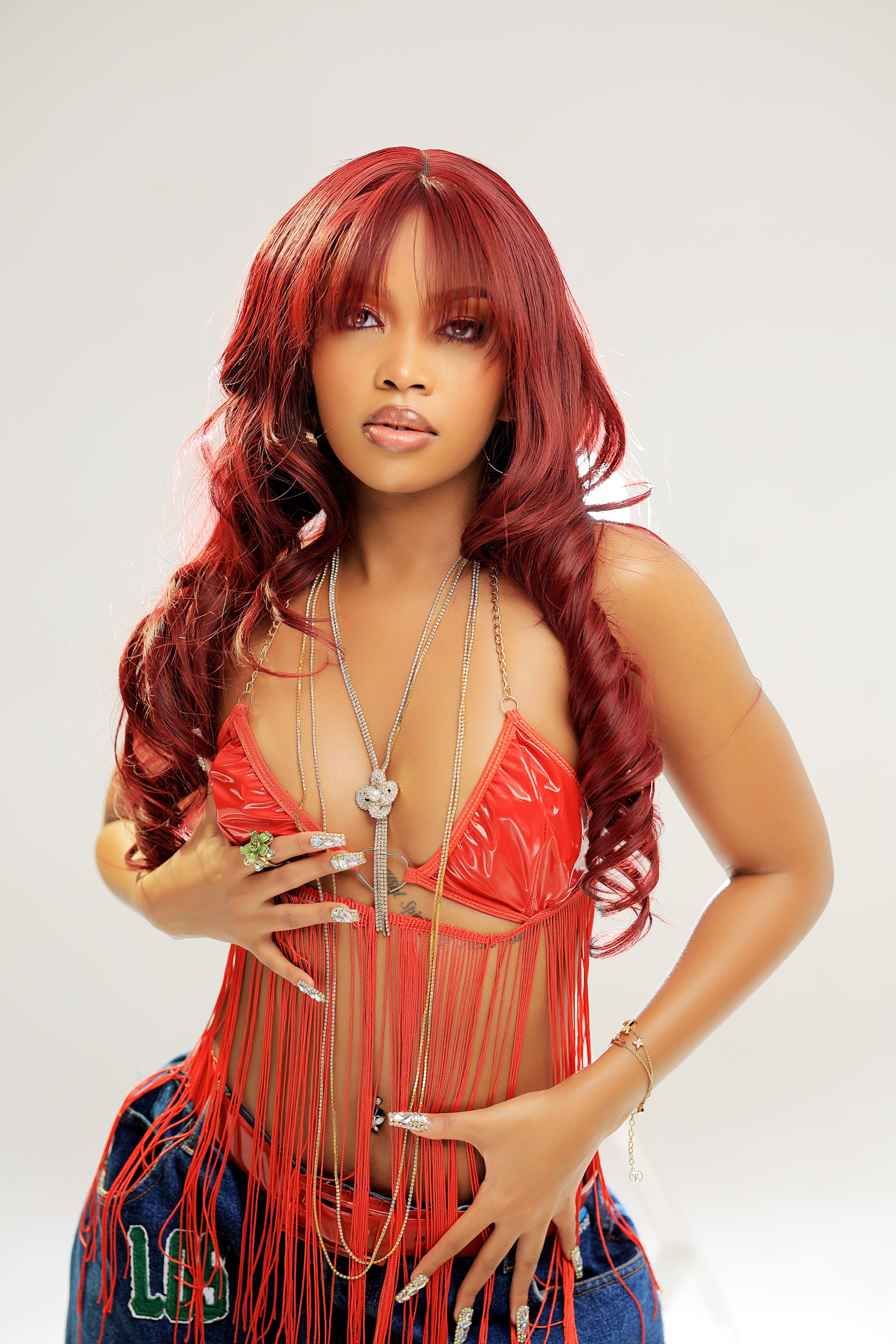
- Sheilah Gashumba in 2026.
- Born: February 7, 1996 (age 30); Uganda
- Education: City Varsity Media and Creative Arts, Cape Town
- Occupations: Media personality; TV host; radio presenter; DJ; digital influencer
- Years active: 2001–present
- Agent: Brian Muhumuza Bishanga / BM Publications
- Presenting career
- Show: NRG Circle
- Station: NRG Radio Uganda
- Show: House of Chefs
- Station: DStv
- Country: Uganda
- Previous shows: Teens Club – WBS TV, Uganda; T-Nation – NTV Uganda; The Beat – NTV Uganda; NBS After5 – NBS Television

Sheilah Gashumba (born February 7, 1996), also known as Lil Stunner, is a Ugandan media personality, DJ and digital influencer. She formerly hosted NBS After5, an entertainment show on NBS Television. She has also been a radio presenter at NRG Uganda, and host of DSTV's House of Chefs in South Africa. She is the managing director of Sarafina Events, a group including her events curation, promotions and management.

== As a cultural figure ==
Gashumba uses social media platforms Snapchat, Instagram, Twitter, Threads, and Facebook to advocate for minimum wage policy for journalists and media personalities in Uganda. She has also worked on promotional campaigns for brands including Don Julio, Martinellis, Africell, Uber, World Remit, Yo! kuKu, Aqua Safe Water, Rio Vega Hair Company Brazil, Coca-Cola and Tecno Mobile.

Gashumba has inspired many youths in East Africa and Africa at large to invest in social capital and leverage virtues of critical thinking, confidence and self esteem.

In 2023, Gashumba opened and launched Gash Luxe, a female broadband one-stop shopping centre that harbours a champagne lounge and content studio located in Kampala where celebrities and entertainers across Africa visit for their fashion styles and video dos.

== Early life and education ==
Sheilah was born to Frank Gashumba and Christine Naluwu Makuza.

She attended Taibah International School, Galaxy International School Kampala, Kabojja International School, and City Varsity Media & Creative Arts in Cape Town, South Africa.

== Career ==
At age 10, Gashumba started presenting a teen's club show on WBS Television in 2007. In 2009, Gashumba made headlines as the young journalist accredited to cover the Commonwealth Heads of Government meeting. She later joined NTV, where she presented T-Nation and later NTV the Beat with Douglas Lwanga.

In November 2021, she joined NBS Television, where she hosted NBS After5, an entertainment show, with MC Kats, Douglas Lwanga, DJ Mercy Pro and DJ Roja from the duo Slick Stuart & DJ Roja.

== As a DJ ==
In April 2025, Gashumba officially launched her career as a professional disc jockey under the stage name DJ Lil Stunner. Her musical style focuses on electronic and African genres, primarily blending Amapiano, House, Afro-soul fusion, and contemporary Ugandan rhythms. Gashumba initially began learning to DJ during the COVID-19 pandemic lockdown through private training sessions with Ugandan DJ Ediwizzy Selekta. In 2024, she enrolled at the RISE Academy in Johannesburg, South Africa, to receive formal technical training in disc jockeying and music software.

As a DJ and event curator, Gashumba founded and hosts "Choplife Sundays," a weekly nightlife event held at the Aura Lounge in Kampala. Under her alias DJ Lil Stunner, she has performed at various regional and international venues. This includes co-headlining the Don Julio Tequila Island Fiesta on Mbudya Island in Tanzania in July 2025, alongside promotional tours and event appearances across the United Kingdom, Canada, Rwanda, Zambia, and Turkey.

== Honors ==
Year	Award	Category	Nominee(s)	Result	Ref.
2013	Buzz Teeniez Awards	Teeniez Teen TV Show presenter	Sheilah Gashumba	Won	
2014	Abryanz Style And Fashion Awards	Best Dressed Female TV Personality Award	Sheilah Gashumba	Nominated	
2015	Abryanz Style And Fashion Awards	Best Dressed Female Media Personality of the Year	Sheilah Gashumba	Nominated	
2016	Starqt Fashion Awards	Media Personality of the year	Sheilah Gashumba	Nominated	
2017	PAFA	Best Fashionista	Sheilah Gashumba	Won	
2018	Abryanz Style And Fashion Awards	Most Stylish Female Celebrity of the Year	Sheilah Gashumba	Nominated	
