= Gangs of Lagos =

- Promotional release poster
- Directed by: Jade Osiberu
- Written by: Kay Jegede; Jade Osiberu
- Produced by: Jade Osiberu; Kemi Lala Akindoju
- Starring: Tobi Bakre; Adesua Etomi; Chike; Chioma Chukwuka; Iyabo Ojo; Damilola Ogunsi; Tayo Faniran; Pasuma
- Edited by: Olakunle Martini Akande; Afolabi Olalekan; Biyi Toluwalase
- Music by: Tolu Obanro
- Production company: Greoh Studios
- Distributed by: Amazon Prime Video
- Release date: 7 April 2023
- Running time: 124 minutes
- Country: Nigeria

Gangs of Lagos is a 2023 Nigerian thriller crime film directed by Jadesola Osiberu and co-written by Kay Jegede and Osiberu. It stars an ensemble cast including Tobi Bakre, Adesua Etomi, Chike, Iyabo Ojo, Chioma Chukwuka, Zlatan, Bimbo Ademoye, Yvonne Jegede, Yinka Quadri, Wasiu Alabi Pasuma, and Yhemolee. The film's plot follows, three friends, Obalola (Bakre), Ify, and Gift, who grew up in Ìsàlẹ̀ Èkó, a neighbourhood controlled by politically connected gangs. As rival factions clash and violence erupts, they become entangled in the escalating gang warfare.

The idea for Gangs of Lagos came up in 2016, while Osiberu was working on her earlier project, Gidi Up. She was inspired by watching residents go about their daily lives through the windows of neighbouring buildings. Tobi was cast in the lead role in February 2021. The film was made as an independent Nollywood production until Amazon acquired it, announcing the deal in September 2022 alongside news that Osiberu had signed a three-year deal with Amazon Prime. Principal photography began in August 18, 2021 took place in neighbourhoods on Lagos Island, The film was shot on RED Digital Cinema DSMC2 MONSTRO 8K VV cameras. Tolu Obanro composed the film's score, and Chike co-wrote lyrics for some of the songs.

Gangs of Lagos premiered at the 2022 Toronto International Film Festival on September 4, 2022, before being theatrically released by Amazon MGM Studios on 7 April 2023. It received critical acclaim. Chioma Chukwuka was recognised for her performances, winning an Africa International Film Festival Award (AFRIFF). Gangs of Lagos drew controversy soon after its release. It was described as "derogatory to the Lagos culture", and the Lagos State government called for it to be banned from Nollywood media. It was also a commercial success, earning more than ₦230 million, which places it among the highest-grossing Nigerian films. On Prime Video, it ranked among the top 10 most-watched Nigerian-produced films outside Nigeria.

== Plot summary ==
In Lagos Island, three friends, Obalola, Gift and Ify, form Ìsàlẹ̀ Èkó, a community plagued by political rivalries, crime, gang violence, theft and power struggles. Obalola witnesses the death of his father, who was once the king of the community, after he is shot by Eyo masquerades.

While on the streets in traffic, the three friends steal a woman’s bag containing cash and an international passport. The woman reports the theft to Alaye Bam Bam, a powerful street kingpin and political godfather in Isale Eko. After capturing Obalola and recognising his bravery, Alaye puts him and his friends to work in his criminal activities.

Obalola’s boldness and street smarts attract the attention of Nino, another street kingpin, who later becomes a gang leader and the next Eleniyan, the most feared gang leader in Isale Eko. Seeing potential in Obalola, Nino takes him under his wing and becomes a father figure to him. He also provides Obalola with temporary relief from the physical and emotional abuse of his deeply religious mother. While living at Nino’s house, Obalola falls in love with Teni, Nino’s neighbour and the daughter of Kazeem.

Unfortunately, Nino is brutally murdered, ruining Obalola’s chances of a better life. After Nino’s death, Obalola and his two other friends become involved in the business of Kazeem, a greedy gang leader who is deep in Lagos politics. Kazeem behaves as a father figure towards Obalola, but his manipulative personality and criminal nature demand a high price.

As the friends grow up, their situation worsens and they go their separate ways. Obalola becomes Kazeem’s hitman, motivated by an aspiration to take care of his family and take revenge on Nino’s killer. Gift fully identifies with the gang lifestyle and finds his strength and power in chaos, whereas Ify dreams of becoming a musician, but loyalty to his friends drags him back to the gangsters’ ways. An important mission planned by Kazeem results in a fierce battle between rival gangs, because of territorial and political interests.

Despite all objections, Ify decides to participate in the operation to help his friends. Unfortunately, the mission ends in a shootout, during which Ify is killed. His death greatly affects Obalola and Gift, who vows to avenge him. Ify’s death becomes the trigger for bloodshed in Isale Eko. His mother, Mama Ify, wants to take revenge on Kazeem. As a result of the bloodshed, Obalola finds out that it was Kazeem who killed Nino. Obalola then starts his own bloody gang war with the goal of taking revenge on Kazeem. Driven by grief and a need for justice, Obalola fights Kazeem and kills him.

== Cast ==
- Tobi Bakre as Obalola a young man drawn into the chaotic and violent world of gangs on Lagos Island. Raised in the slums, Obalola struggles with his destiny, loyalty, and morality as he rises in the ranks of the gang hierarchy.
  - Maleek Sanni as Young Obalola
- Adesua Etomi as Gift Obalola's childhood friend and a vital member of their close-knit group.
  - Small Mummy as Young Gift
- Chike as Ify another of Obalola’s close friends. whose dream is to become an Afrobeat star.
  - Nifemi Lawal as Young Ify
- Tayo Faniran as Nino Obaloba's adopted street father a complex character whose relationship with Obalola and Kazeem creates tension and conflict.
- Olarotimi Fakunle as Kazeem the ruthless gang leader who mentors Obalola and ushers him into a life of crime. His character embodies the harsh and unrelenting realities of gang leadership.
- Iyabo Ojo as Mama Obalola the protagonist's mother.
- Chioma Akpotha as Mama Ify, Mother of Ify a single parent trying to shield her child from the grim realities of their environment.
- Toyin Abraham as Bamidele
- Zlatan Ibile as Kash a gang member whose actions add an unpredictable edge to the story.
- Yhemolee as Muri Toronto, a close associate of Ify and Obalola, who was also Gift's fiancé.
- Pasuma as London another key player in the gang.
- Mr Macaroni as Wemimo
- Funke Williams as Blessing
- Bimbo Ademoye as Teni, Kazeem's daughter who along the line fells in love with Obalola after returning to Nigeria.
- Damilola Ogunsi as Ekun
- Demi Banwo as Bolaji
- Funke Williams as Blessing
- Black Kamoru as Terrible
- Yinka Quadri as Olorogun

== Production ==
=== Development ===
Gangs of Lagos is directed by Jadesola Osiberu, known for Isoken (2017), Sugar Rush (2019), and Brotherhood (2022). The film was co-produced by Kemi Lala Akindoju and produced under a three-year partnership between Amazon Prime Video and Osiberu's production company, Greoh Studios. Osiberu collaborated with Akindoju and K. I. Jegede on the screenplay, which drew on Lagos' urban setting and culture.

According to Jade Osiberu the creator of Gangs of Lagos the idea for the film came during the production of the TV series Gidi Up in Ìsàlẹ̀ Èkó, around ten years before the film's production. Osiberu stated that the movie was inspired by what she witnessed through the window of a building adjacent to where she was filming and saw a mother preparing dinner while shouting at her children. Osiberu stated that she used the experience to come up with the storyline and added that the contrast between the poverty level of the place and the fact that it is close to the commercial and financial district of Lagos inspired her to make the film. Osiberu said she developed the film to explore the lives of people growing up in Ìsàlẹ̀ Èkó, drawing inspiration from the area's social conditions and economic inequality. She stated that she wanted to tell a story about gangs that emphasized the human experiences of those born into that environment, rather than focusing solely on violence. In an interview with Al Jazeera, Osiberu cited influences such as Martin Scorsese and Spike Lee, whose gangster classics shaped her storytelling. She explained, “[I] always knew I wanted to tell a story about a child growing up in this world who is not able to get out".

Gangs of Lagos marked a milestone in Nigerian cinema as it became the first Amazon Original film from Africa.

=== Filming, production design and challenges ===
"Actually, Gangs of Lagos was shot independently two years ago, before Amazon Prime Video actually entered the market and before we met the Amazon team. At the time, we basically came together, my friends and I, to fund-raise for the film. We were an independent force. It was a very ambitious project. But it's a project that I had been inspired to write 10 years ago. I just knew I really wanted to make the film. So we went ahead and made it. "

— The Hollywood Reporter

Principal photography for Gangs of Lagos started in 2021 and lasted for two months, from the 18th of June to the 18th of August. The majority of the movie was filmed in Isale Eko, a historic neighborhood of Lagos Island. The filming faced challenges during production. According to Osiberu, the hardest scene in the movie to make was the climax scene at the party since it involved problems such as blackouts, breakdowns of generators, problems with traffic, and organizing many extras. She described filmmaking in Lagos demands good logistical planning because of the unpredictability of the city. She also states that the whole point of this scene is to contradict all expectations through an ordinary Nigerian party ending up with a shooting. The film was shot in RED Digital Cinema DSMC2 MONSTRO 8K VV cameras.

The production design of Gangs of Lagos focused on depicting the urban environment of Lagos through attention to elements such as color palette, architecture, and street scenes. The cinematography, led by Olumuyiwa Oyedele, used camera movements intended to capture the activity of Lagos’s streets. The visual style reflects the city’s environment as presented in the film. During the production, the filmmakers faced challenges while shooting in some of the more sensitive areas of Lagos, particularly the ghettos. Chioma Akpotha, one of the lead actors in the film, revealed that the crew had to engage with local "area boys", a term commonly used in Nigeria to describe groups of young men who often control activities in certain urban areas, to ensure a smooth filming process.

=== Casting ===
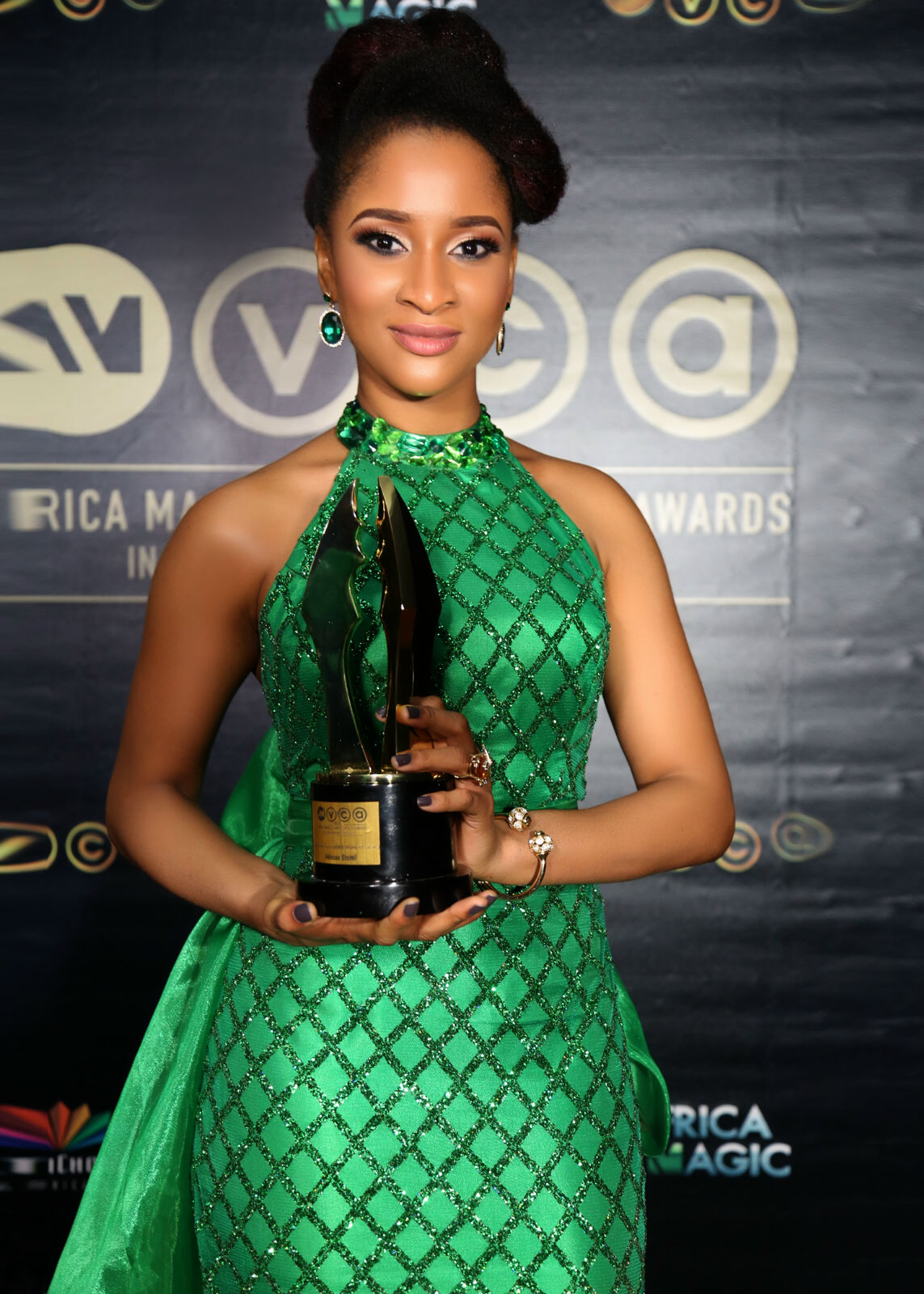
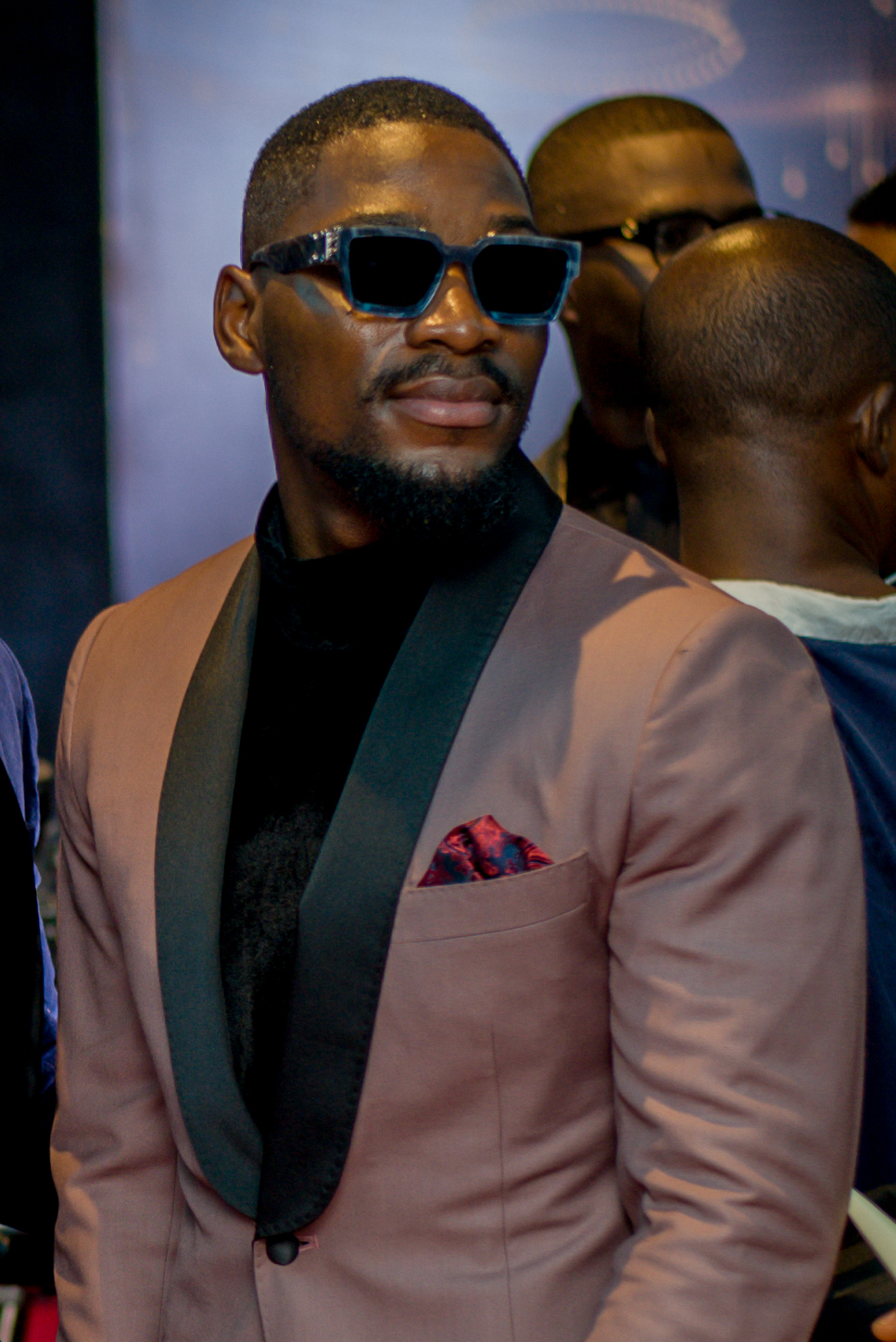
The performances of Adesua Etomi, Tobi Bakre and Chike garnered widespread critical acclaim, earning Adesua Etomi and Tobi Bakre African Movie Academy Awards nominations.

The film employed local talents both in front of and behind the camera. Cast members, including Tobi Bakre, Adesua Etomi-Wellington, and Chike, brought their performances to life, supported by a production team capturing the city's essence. Chioma Chukwuka Akpotha 's performance in the movie was widely praised by everyone and she also won an AFRIFF award For it. In June 2021, Pulse NG reported that the shortlist had expanded to include Pasuma. During a movie interaction, Osiberu explained her decision to add Pasuma and Zlatan to the cast, saying, "Pasuma has a long history of acting. Since we shot in Isale Eko, who else could fit better? Pasuma is perfect for that world."

During the Daily Post Interview, Bakre talked about the preparation he went through before taking on the role of Obalola in the film. According to Bakre, to get into the right state before filming, he listened to emotional music, such as "Celia’s Song" by Tiwa Savage. which helped helped him connect with the character's emotions. "I wasn’t trying to fake it [my role]; I needed to genuinely feel the sadness and put myself in the character’s scenario."

== Music ==
Tolu Obanro composed the score for the film, which was released by Greoh Studios. The opening musical cue received praise, with Native Magazine describing it as "spectacular." Reflecting on his creative process, Obanro stated, "I wanted to create a score that felt massive and huge." The soundtrack also features an additional song by Chike.

== Release and distribution ==
it was screened at the 2022 Toronto International Film Festival on 11 September 2022. Gang of Lagos had a limited theatrical release on 7 April 2023, exclusively on Amazon Prime Video. It is one of the first Nigerian original films released directly on the platform as part of Amazon's investment in Nollywood. The film's release marked a step in the collaboration between Nigerian filmmakers and global streaming services, expanding the reach of Nollywood to international audiences.

== Reception ==
=== Box office ===
Gangs of Lagos earned a total of ₦230 million in Nigeria. Within the first 20 days of its release in 2023, the film garnered 15,000 views.

=== Critical response ===
Afrocritik's Seyi Lasisi's 3-star review said the film "like Brotherhood, isn't fiction. It is a cinematic exploration of our lives as Nigerians. It spotlights the damage Nigerian societies and Nigerians are compelled to witness when the government is apathetic to developing and solving social issues". Shola-Adido Oladotun of Premium Times praised Gangs of Lagos, describing its Cinematography as "top-tier" and noting its effective use of real-life locations in Isale Eko. He also commended the casting and stunt work, as well as the film’s visual presentation. However, he criticised aspects of the writing and pacing, and suggested that the story would have benefited from a television series format to allow for deeper character development, particularly for supporting characters such as Kazeem. He gave the film 8/10 stars. Emma Vine of Ready Steady Cut described Gangs of Lagos as a "gritty, compelling crime drama" and praised its tone, cinematography, and camera work. She also commended the cast performances and highlighted the visual continuity between the adult actors and their younger counterparts as a notable strength that enhanced the film’s believability.

Johnny Loftus of Decider praised the performances of the cast, particularly highlighting Tobi Bakre, Adesua Etomi-Wellington, and Chike Ezekpeazu-Osebuka. He singled out Chike's portrayal of Ify, a character born into gang life despite his evident desire to pursue a different path, such as performing on stage as his alter ego, Panama. Liam Lacey of Original-Cin awarded the film a grade of B, noting that it is "at its most rewarding when it breaks away from the Scorsese-Coppola tradition to deliver sharp critiques of the Nigerian criminal-political complex."

=== Accolades ===
Gangs of Lagos garnered multiple nominations and accolades, including recognition as Best Nigerian Film and Best Visual Effects at the 2023 African Movie Academy Awards. Adesua Etomi-Wellington won the award for Best Actress in a Leading Role. Chioma Chukwuka won the Africa International Film Festival Award for her performance in the movie. In total, the film received five nominations and won four awards, notably for Best Visual Effects and Best Young/Promising Actor, awarded to Maleek Sanni.

List of accolades received by Gangs of Lagos
Year	Award	Category	Result
2023	African Movie Academy Awards	Best Actress in a Leading Role - Adesua Etomi-Wellington	Nominated
2023	African Movie Academy Awards	Best Young/Promising Actor - Maleek Sanni	Won
2023	African Movie Academy Awards	Best Visual Effects - Emmanuel Bassey	Won
2023	African Movie Academy Awards	Best Make-Up - Omowunmi Okungbure	Nominated
2023	African Movie Academy Awards	Best Nigerian Film - Gang Of Lagos	Nominated
2023	National Film and Video Censors Board Award	Best Nigerian Film - Gang Of Lagos	Nominated

== Controversy ==
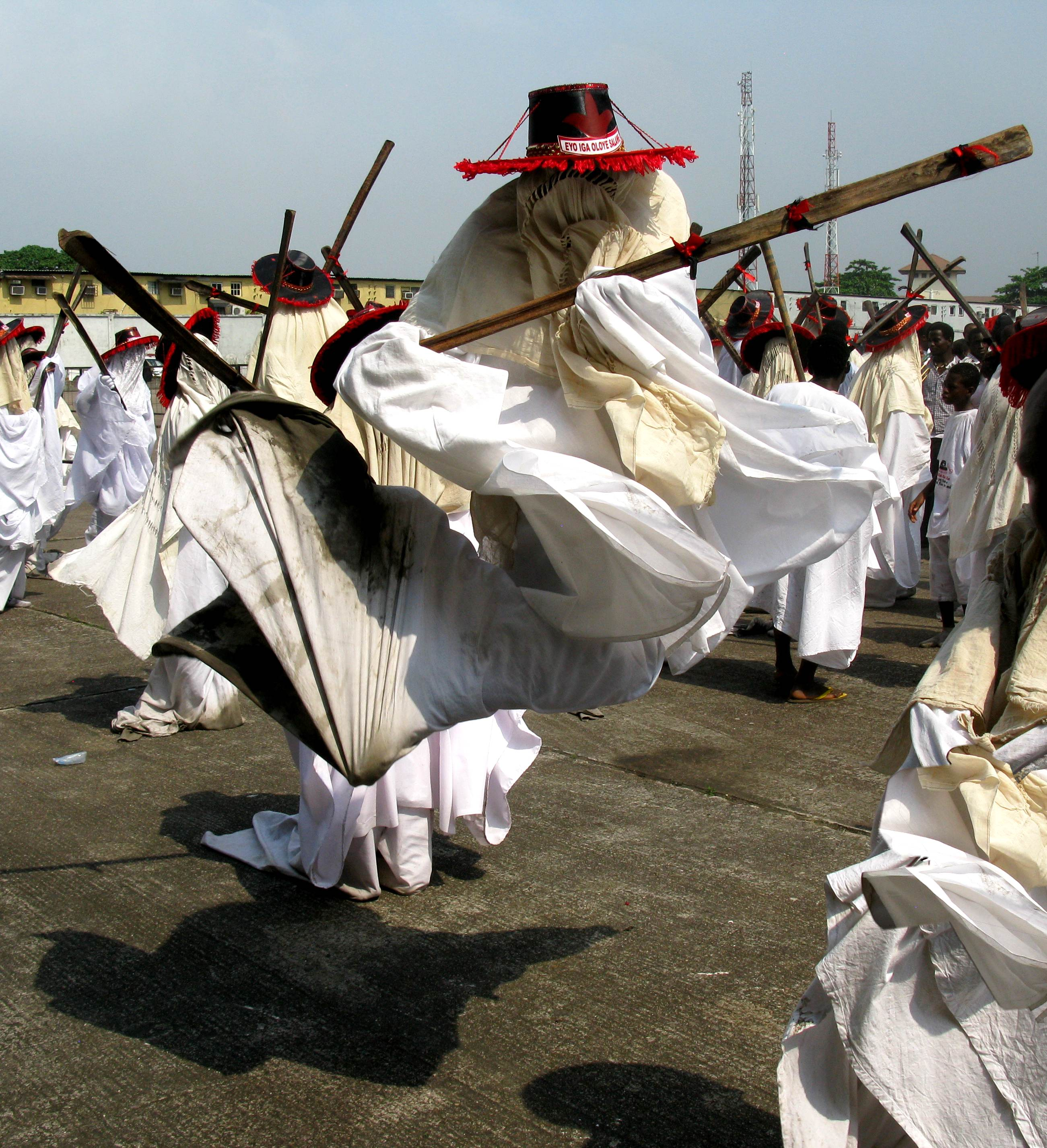
Many Lagosians expressed that the filmmakers showed lack of respect for the traditional Eyo Masquerade

The portrayal of the Eyo masquerade in the film became very controversial as well. The majority of people on social media believe that the filmmakers were being disrespectful towards the cultural tradition that is embodied by these masquerades. One group of Lagosians threatened a lawsuit in response, and another followed through and took the matter to court.

Reno Omokri criticized the film as "defamatory," in a post on Twitter tweeting that its portrayal undermines Nigeria's image, stating, "De-marketing your country through movies is like punching holes in a ship on which you are a passenger. Who loses?"

Amongst those who also condemned the film on these grounds were the Lagos State government, the Kosoko royal family of Lagos, Chief Adebola Dosunmu of the Dosunmu royal family, and Nollywood veteran Prince Jide Kosoko acting in a private capacity. The National Film and Video Censors Board, Nigeria's censor, also weighed in on the matter; its head explained that it was not empowered to regulate films and television shows shown on streaming platforms, though a legal amendment to give it that power was currently being considered by the National Assembly.

In April 2023, the Lagos State Government together with some traditional rulers raised concerns over the film, due to its negative depiction of the cultural heritage of the State. The government described the movie as "unprofessional and misleading," because it portrayed the culture of Lagos in an offensive way. Speaking on this matter, Uzamat Akinbile-Yussuf, Commissioner for Tourism, Arts and Culture of Lagos State, indicated that the movie was offensive to the history and culture of Lagos as well as an unjust depiction of Lagosians as barbarians.

Similarly, the Oba of Lagos, Rilwan Aremu Akiolu, labeled the film defamatory and sacrilegious, criticizing its depiction of the Eyo as violent gangs involved in murders and terrorizing citizens. He demanded that Amazon Web Services, Greoh Studios, and the film's producers remove all representations of the Eyo from the movie.

=== Amazon response ===
Amazon Web Services Nigeria, a subsidiary of Amazon Inc. and the founder of Prime Video Nigeria, stated in response to the ₦10 billion fine imposed on its production by The Isale Eko Descendants’ Union. Amazon asserted that its film, Gangs of Lagos, does not harm any individual or group. The company also challenged the regulatory authority of the Lagos State Government in this matter.
