= Gangs of Lagos (soundtrack) =

Gangs of Lagos (Original Soundtrack)

Soundtrack album by Tolu Obanro and Chike
- Released: 7 April 2023
- Recorded: 2023
- Length: 36:06 (standard edition)
- Label: Greoh Studios

Gangs of Lagos (Original Soundtrack) is the soundtrack album to the 2023 thriller crime film Gangs of Lagos. The film score was composed by Tolu Obanro. The album features 16 tracks and was released by Greoh Studios on April 7, 2023. Chike wrote and performed a song entitled "On Fire" for the end credits.

== Background ==
Tolu Obanro was announced as the composer for Gangs of Lagos, marking another collaboration with director Jade Osiberu, following his work on the score for Brotherhood (2022). The soundtrack also features an additional song by Chike.

== Track listing ==
Gang of Lagos (Original Soundtrack)
No.	Title	Length
1.	"Afro Nino"	1:52
2.	"Jamba Mbo"	1:39
3.	"Koleyewon"	3:06
4.	"Ejekajo Oba"	1:14
5.	"Afro Kegite"	4:00
6.	"Ejekajo War"	0:54
7.	"Ejekajo"	2:00
8.	"Gol Eyo"	0:58
9.	"New Sad To Danger"	5:04
10.	"Nino Dies"	4:21
11.	"Oba Maina"	2:24
12.	"Pana Tension"	1:15
13.	"Popofel Jesh"	2:17
14.	"Awon Gangs"	1:47
15.	"Won re"	1:56
16.	"Bad Kazeem"	1:56
Total length:		36:06

=== Additional music ===
- "On Fire" – written and performed by Chike

== Release history ==
Release history and formats for Gangs of Lagos (Original Soundtrack)
Region	Date	Format(s)	Editions(s)	Label(s)	Ref.
Various	7 April 2023	Digital download; streaming; CD	Standard	Greoh Studios	
