= Oyenbot =

Ugandan actress

- Born: 7 July; Panyigoro, Nebbi, Uganda
- Citizenship: Ugandan
- Education: Makerere University
- Occupation: Actress
- Years active: 2003–present
- Website: oyenbot.com

Gladys Oyenbot is a Ugandan actress, singer and producer professionally known by her mononym Oyenbot. She is known for playing Dorotia on Mpeke Town (2018), and as Beatrice on the drama series Yat Madit Yat Madit (2016). In 2020 she starred in numerous films including a thriller film The Girl in the Yellow Jumper, in a legal drama film Kafa Coh, Family Tree, and Down Hill. She also had starring roles in a romantic drama series Love Makanika (2015) by Dilman Dila, Reflections (2018) by Nana Kagga and 5 @Home(2017) which aired on Fox Life Africa. Her other notable screen work includes a Haunted Soul (2013), Day 256(2017), Communion (2018), King of Darkness (2015), and Kyenvu (2018) the short film she co- produced alongside Hedwyn Kyambadde.

== Career ==
In 2016 Oyenbot starred in a regular role as Beatrice, a mother, and wife who suffered domestic violence silently on Yat Madit TV series that aired on NTV Uganda.

She also stars as Amanda, a lady with trust issues from her past relationships who falls in love with a married man, and father of her unborn child on the upcoming Nana Kagga’s TV series titled Reflections.

Oyenbot starred in Mira Nair’s Walt Disney movie Queen of Katwe as the shopkeeper. She also played Lupita Nyong'os stand in and body double on set of the same film.

Oyenbot has participated in numerous stage productions. She participated in Matei Vișniec's play, "The Body of a Woman as a Battlefield in the Bosnian War"; an Aida Mbowa-directed stage play Desperate to Fight about mental violence.

== Filmography ==
=== As an actress ===
==== Film and television ====
Year	Title	Role	Director	Production company	Notes
2022	Boy No Fear	Witch Doctor	Jonathan Curtis		
2022	I Eat What I Like	Hellen	Shari		
2022	KeyCard	Shamila	Douglas Dubois Sebamala	Sebamala Arts	Short film
2022	Vanilla	Miriam	Aganza Kisaka		Short film
2021	Black Glove	Shamila	Angella Emurwon	Sebamala Arts	Written and produced by Douglas Dubois Sebamala
2020	The Girl in the Yellow Jumper	Vicky	Loukman Ali	Produced at Loukout Films by Morocco Omari, Ntare Mwine, Suubi Elvis	Distributed internationally by Netflix
2019	The Reporter	Nekesa	Sharpe Sewali		TV Series (pre production)
2019	Family Tree	Theresa	Nicole Nabugabo		Short Film (post production)
2018	Reflections	Amanda	Nana Kagga	Savana Moon production	TV series
2018	Kaffa-coh	Kisaka	Gilbert Lukalia	Amani House production	Feature Film
2018	Mpeke Town	Dorotia	Shani Grewal	Mediae Production	TV Series
2017	256	Midwife	Stella Namatovu	Boda Boda production	Short Film
2017	Communion	Gashanga	Patience Nitumwesiga	Shagikatales	Short Film
2016	Yat Madit	Beatrice	Irene Kulabako	Trivision	Won three Awards
2016	Queen of Katwe	Shopkeeper/Stand in double	Mira Nair	Walt Disney Studios	Feature Film
2016	The Bag	Mukyala Mulokole	Douglas Kasule Benda		Short Film- (Post production)
2015	5 @Home	co-star	Lloyd Lutara	Fast Track production	On Fox Life Africa
2013	Haunted Souls	Aciru	Godwin Otwoma	Artling Production	Short Film

==== Theatre ====
Year	Title	Role	Director
2017	Hustle Box	Student	Rehema Nanfuka
2016	Ga-ad	Toto, old woman, singer	Adong L Judith
2016	Heaven's Gates, Hell's Flames	Spoilt brat	Sheila K Tugume
2015	The Body of a Woman as a Battlefield in the Bosnian War	Dora and others	Benoit Vitae and Bogdan Palie
2014	Desperate to Fight	Marta	Aida Mbowa
2014	Much Ado About Nothing	Hero	Peter Wiedmann and Nathalie
2013	Macbeth	A witch	Tom Adlam and Angela Emuron
2013	Beautiful Africa	As self, singer	MercyRose Ssendegeya
2012	Silent Voices	Margret	Denis Hilton
2012	Oliver Twist	Charlotte, Oliver's mother, Soloist	Trudy Mcgilvry
2012	Heaven's Gates, Hell's Flames	Spoilt brat	Sheila K Tugume
2010	Restore Tour	Mother, Abducted Child	Dawn Stride

==== Radio Drama ====
Year	Title	Role	Director	Company	Notes
2010	Mako-Mere	Catherine Achieng	Achiro P Olwoch	Attiku Films	Radio Drama (Voices over)
2006	Rock Point 256	Rebecca	Asiimwe Deborah	Straight Talk	Radio Drama series ( Voice over)

=== As a producer ===
Year	Title/Event	Director	Notes
2018	Kyenvu	Kemiyondo Coutinho	Short Film
2017	Nyege Nyege International Music Festival	Poppy Spowage	Music Festival

== Awards and nominations ==
Year	Award	Category	Works	Status
2022	Biff International Film Festival	Best Actress	Vanilla	Won
2022	Crown International Film Festival	Best Actress	Vanilla	Won
2022	SOFIE Awards	Best Supporting Actress	KeyCard	Nominated

== See also ==
- Cinema of Uganda
- Ugandan television
- Uganda women in film
- List of Ugandan actors
- Queen of Katwe
