= The Girl in the Yellow Jumper =

- Official poster
- Directed by: Loukman Ali
- Screenplay by: Loukman Ali
- Story by: Loukman Ali
- Produced by: Suubi Elvis; Connie Ernest; Loukman Ali; Morocco Omari
- Starring: Rehema Nanfuka; Philip Luswata; Michael Wawuyo Jr.; Michael Wawuyo; Oyenbot; Maurice Kirya; Morocco Omari
- Cinematography: Naizi Nasser
- Edited by: Loukman Ali
- Music by: Andrew Ahuurra
- Production companies: Loukout Films (film production); Quad-A Records (audio post-production)
- Distributed by: Ninja Studios (presents); Victoria Films: Netflix
- Release date: 18 April 2020 (Kampala)
- Running time: 125 minutes
- Country: Uganda

The Girl in the Yellow Jumper is a 2020 Ugandan mystery-thriller produced and directed by Loukman Ali and starring Rehema Nanfuka, Philip Luswata, Michael Wawuyo Jr., Michael Wawuyo, Oyenbot and Maurice Kirya. After a festival run throughout 2021, it was released on Netflix on December 26 of that year, becoming the first Ugandan film to be made available on the streamer.

== Plot summary ==
A man is watching a television report on the "Cigarette Butt serial Killer" when he is taken hostage by a mysterious figure wearing a yellow jumper.

Later, he is found by a highway, disheveled and wearing a yellow jumper, and is rescued by an off-duty cop, who is driving an elderly crime witness (who is implied to be connected with the Cigarette Butt Serial Killer case) to a police station back in the city. The man tells his story: he was captured and tortured by two female religious extremists for a political cartoon, but managed to escape after stealing their shotgun and killing one of his captors.

The cop does not fully believe the story, but offers to drive the man to the police station, as he is already headed in that direction. The cop receives a call with concerning news about his girlfriend and decides to stop home, where he would meet his girlfriend's sister, before heading to the police station.

The man gets off the car and heads to the bathroom, and recognizes the cop's girlfriend's sister as the surviving kidnapper. He panics and tries to leave, but the kidnapper has also recognized him and tells the cop, saying the man has killed his girlfriend. The cop enters the bathroom and pulls out his pistol to torture the man by "kneecapping".

The man is next seen handcuffed beside the elderly witness on the backseat of the police officer's car, who is still driving towards the police station. The passenger's seat is now occupied by the kidnapper, who is telling a different version of the events: the man is a sexual predator who has impregnated a 12-year-old girl, who later died when he tried to abort her himself. The cop's girlfriend, who was a nurse at hospital where the girl died, sought out revenge with her sister's help.

The man struggles to grab the kidnapper's shotgun that he still has on his bag, but he draws the cop's attention. There's a shootout and the only survivor is the elderly witness. He stumbles out of the vehicle, flags down a passing car and kills the driver using the cop's pistol. He escapes the scene in the stolen car, leaving a cigarette butt on the ground first.

== Cast ==
Michael Wawuyo Jr.	Jim Akena
Rehema Nanfuka	Dorothy
Maurice Kirya	Patrick Asimwe
Michael Wawuyo	Old Man
Oyenbot	Vicky (as Gladys Oyenbot)
Philip Luswata	Prof. Mahmood Sali
Rest of cast listed alphabetically:
Joan Ahhurra	Fish Lady (voice)
Kavuma Yahaya Ali	Burial Extra 1 / Old Lady
Kavumba Mustafa Ali	Sketch Artist
Loukman Ali	Bob
Muhammad Ali	Burial Extra 3
Saum Ali	Old Man's Granddaughter / Blada Extra 2
Aliyah	Suzan
Asaba Jumah	Hakim
Nayonga Christine	Young Patrick
Cleopatra	Radio Presenter #1
Isaac	Burial Extra 2
Dorothy Katera	Old Man's Daughter / Mama Suzan
Timothy Magumba	Blada Extra 3
Andrew Makumby	Blada Extra 1
Stella Nandudu	Fish Lady
Patrick Nkakalukanyi	Pump Attendant
Morocco Omari	Expert
River Dan Rugaju	Walusimbi Josh
Solaie Titi	News Anchor
Sekaayi Tucker	Little Person
Frank Turyatunga	Guy Watching TV
Shawn Wanendeya	Blada Extra 4
Naderm Nihad	Paul

== Production ==
=== Pre-production ===
Loukman Ali wrote the script earlier. Since he is also a sketch artist, he storyboarded all the shots at this stage. Props testing were also done since a couple of Instagram posts show an unidentified model in a gas mask, which later turned out to be in the film.

=== Filming ===
Principal photography began in 2018 in Northern part of Uganda, and despite all the challengesduring the shooting, Loukman and his cinematographer Naizi Nasser managed to wrap up in August 2018.

On 21 January 2019, Loukman uploaded a first look captioned as a test footage from the girl in the yellow jumper which received a bunch of positive reviews from all around the world.

The film was shot on Red Cameras. Car mounts were used for moving car scenes, as well as cranes and gimbals.

Since this was Loukman's first feature film, filming was at sometimes put on hold due to running out of funds, as he was quoted about in an interview with Kampala's The Sun:

“We had every single problem that you can have on a film set,” Ali says. “Shooting in Uganda is not easy, every single location we go to, they chase us away.” and also Loukman Ali: There were times the actors went without food because we had used up all the money. We stopped filming for more than a year as we scraped together resources. The actors would return after months having changed, having gained weight, grown hair or a beard where there was only stubble in the previous scene.

=== Post-production ===
The film was edited by Loukman Ali, who blended computer generated imagery (CGI) created with cinema4d into his shots.

The first teaser trailer, released on April 18, 2020, was a viral hit due to its perceived high quality,

==== Music ====
Artists at Quad A, an African audio production company, worked on the sound design and film scoring headed by Andrew Ahuurra, who had previously worked on various films, including Disney's Queen of Katwe. A number of already existing Ugandan songs like Bobiwine's "Bada" were added, alongside others originally composed for the film.

Sound department

- Andrew Ahuurra: re-recording mixer / supervising sound editor
- Tonny Timothy Kasoma: foley artist (as Tonny Kassoma)
- Paul Kazibwe: dialogue editor
- Lilian Keishanyu: sound effects editor
- Adnan Senkumba: boom operator
- Shantos Ssekito: boom operator

== Release ==
=== COVID-19 pandemic and hacking ===
The COVID-19 pandemic reached Uganda in March 2020 and affected the premiere of the film as the country was put on lockdown. There were plans for the film to premiere on paid streaming sites, but the production company's online accounts were hacked and the film was leaked on their very YouTube channel for free streaming just days before its premiere date.

It was later discovered that Loukman Ali had uploaded a combination of trailers making up to 1 hour and 22 minutes labelled as "THE GIRL IN THE YELLOW JUMPER leaked full movie" as a prank to increase hype around the movie.

=== Initial release fail ===
The film was initially to be released locally in Ugandan theaters on 20 April 2020, but the COVID-19 Pandemic forced theaters to close down. A disappointed Loukman Ali lost his positivity in filmmaking. Later, he made a YouTube short film The Blind Date, followed by its prequel, Sixteen Rounds.

=== Netflix release ===
On Friday 13, Loukman announced that his had become the first local film to be picked up by Netflix. It was made available for streaming the following Friday. Loukman stated that after the film's release getting interrupted by the outbreak, he handed it to distributors who sold the movie streaming rights to Netflix.

== Accolades ==
Year	Award	Category	Recipient	Results	Refs
2022	Africa Magic Viewers Choice Awards (AMVCA)	Best Feature film East Africa	Mariam Ndagire (on behalf of Loukman Ali)	Won	
2021	Realtime International Film Festival	Best Director	Loukman Ali	Won	
2021	Mostra De Cinemas Africanos			Selected	
