= DeeYasso =

Nigerian record producer and musician

- Also known as: DeeYasso
- Born: Dennis Hope Yasso; Taraba State, Nigeria
- Genres: Afrobeats; pop; hip hop; contemporary R&B
- Occupations: Record producer; DJ; singer; songwriter
- Instruments: Keyboard; synthesizer; drum; shekere; sampler; Guitar
- Years active: 2019–present
- Label: Independent

Dennis Hope Yasso (born 5 May 1991), professionally known as DeeYasso is a Nigerian record producer, mixing & mastering engineer, multi-Instrumentalist, songwriter and a lawyer. He made his mainstream debut when he produced Yemi Alade's song titled "Tomorrow" which received a nomination at the 67th Annual Grammy Awards for Best African Music Performance

== Early life ==
Dee Yasso was born in Taraba State, Nigeria He attended University of Maiduguri, where he studied law from 2010 to 2016, he attended the Nigerian Law School Abuja afterwards and was successfully called to the Nigerian Bar Association as a Lawyer and Solicitor of The Federal Republic Of Nigeria. At a very young age, he showcased his interest in music in a church choir, where he first started playing drums in the year 1999. He learned to play the guitars and piano. Dee Yasso started production in the year 2006 professionally

== Career ==
On February 14, 2020, Dee Yasso primarily produced Chike’s debut studio album Boo of the Booless which was nominated for Album of the Year at the 2020 Headies Awards. On February 26, 2021 he primarily produced Ric Hassani album titled "The Prince I Became" In December 2023, he produced a chart topping single Egwu by Chike and MohBad which peaked at No. 1 at the Official Nigeria Top 100, earning him a debut on the TurnTable charts producer top 100 So far he has worked with major artists in the Nigeria music industry like Yemi Alade, Dave, Sauti Sol, Oxlade and more.

In July 2024, he produced three songs on Yemi Alade's studio album "Rebel Queen", including a single titled "Tomorrow" which received a nomination at the 67th Annual Grammy Awards for Best African Music Performance.

== Discography ==
=== Selected albums produced and songwriting credit ===
| Artist | Album | Release date | Certifications | Label | Note |
|---|---|---|---|---|---|
| Chike | Boo of the Booless | 14 February 2020 | | Independent | Primary producer; Co-writer |
| Ric Hassani | The Prince I Became | 26 January 2021 | | Independent | Primary producer |
| Chike | The Brother's Keeper | 25 August 2022 | | Independent | Produced 6 songs |
| Kizz Daniel | Maverick | 28 July 2023 | | Flyboy Inc | Produced 1 song |
| Chike | Son Of Chike | 19 July 2024 | | Independent | Produced 9 songs; Mixed and Mastered all tracks |
| Yemi Alade | Rebel Queen | 26 July 2024 | | Effyzzie Music GroupRebel Movement & Universal Music Africa | Produced 4 songs |
| Amaeya | Like A Flower | 31 July 2024 | | Encore Recording | Produced 1 song |

=== Singles produced ===
| Year | Artiste | Title |
|---|---|---|
| 2023 | Chike & MohBad | "Egwu" |
| 2023 | Oxlade & Dave | "INTOXYCATED" |
| 2023 | Nasboi feat. Wande Coal | "Umbrella" |
| 2024 | Nasboi | "Small Money" |

== Awards and nominations ==
| Year | Awards ceremony | Award description(s) | Results | Ref |
|---|---|---|---|---|
| 2021 | The Beatz Awards | Afro Soul Producer of the Year | Won | |
| 2022 | The Beatz Awards | Afro Soul Producer of the Year | Won | |
| 2023 | The Beatz Awards | Afro R'n'B Producer | Won | |
