= Diane Russet =

Nigerian actress (born 1996)

- Born: 28 February 1996 (age 30); Lagos State, Nigeria
- Citizenship: Nigeria
- Education: Eastern Mediterranean University
- Occupation: Filmmaker
- Years active: 2019-present
- Known for: Ricordi; Bayi; Big Brother Naija
- Awards: 2023 Africa Magic Viewers Choice Awards (Won)

Precious Diane Yashim, born 28 February 1996 popularly known as Diane Russet is a Filmmaker, Actor, Producer, Business Enthusiast and Ex Big Brother 4 housemate.

She's known for her Drama Series “Ricordi” which won Best Original Drama Series at the 2023 Africa Magic Viewers' Choice Awards.

== Background and education ==
Diane Russet was born in Ilorin, Kwara State, and she relocated to Kaduna State at the age of 2. She studied at LifeSpring Christian Academy, Kaduna before attending Command Secondary School, Kaduna.

After completing her secondary education in 2011, she enrolled in a Foundation course in medicine at the University of Debrecen in Hungary. She then continued to Eastern Mediterranean University in Cyprus to pursue a Bachelor's in Molecular Biology and Genetics. In November 2017 she returned to Nigeria.

== Career ==
Diane Russet has produced and starred in three short films and a series, including Therapist, Bayi, Storm, Mo and Mel, There is something wrong with the Bamideles, and “Ricordi” starred alongside a Nigerian politician and a former senator Dino Melaye, which she used to raise awareness of social concerns and illnesses.

In 2022, She has received nominations for her movie “Bayi” for the 2022 Africa Magic Viewers' Choice Awards and Mo x Mel was nominated for the Nxt awards.

In 2023, she won Best Original Drama Series at the Africa Magic Viewers' Choice Awards.

== Filmography ==
=== Television ===
Year	Title	Role	Notes	Ref
2019	Big Brother 4	Herself	Reality show	

=== Films ===
Year	Title	Role	Notes
2020	Therapist	--	
2020	Bayi	--	
2020	Storm	--	
2021	Mo and Mel	Melinda	
2021	Ricordi	Fejiro	Michael Akinrogunde
2022	There is something wrong with the Bamideles	Nkiru	Michael Akinrogunde
2022	Brotherhood (2022 film)	Efe	Directed by Loukman Ali
2023	The Bloom Bos	Miss Fareedah	Directed by Xela
2024	Dear Diane	Temidayo	TV Series

=== Music videos ===
Year	Song	Artiste	Notes	Ref
2020	If You No Love	Chike (singer)	Video vixen	

== Awards and nominations ==
Year	Event	Category	Result	Ref
2022	2022 Africa Magic Viewers' Choice Awards	Best Indigenous Language Movie or TV Series (Hausa)	Nominated	
2022	Nxt Awards	Celebrity Sensation of the Year	Nominated	
2023	Africa Magic Viewers' Choice Awards	Best Original Drama Series	Won	
