= Martini Akande =

Nigerian film editor

Martini Akande (born September 18, 1993) is a Nigerian film editor. He was nominated for Best Picture Editor at the 2023 Africa Magic Viewers' Choice Awards for Brotherhood and Best Picture Editor at the 2025 Africa Magic Viewers' Choice Awards for Christmas in Lagos.

== Career ==
Akande’s career began with smaller editing jobs before his breakout project, Nneka the Pretty Serpent, in 2020. He later edited Brotherhood (2022), a crime thriller directed by Jade Osiberu, which was the highest-grossing film of 2022. He is also known for his work on Christmas in Lagos (2024). Some of Akande’s projects have also been featured on Amazon Prime Video and Netflix.

== Filmography and awards ==
Year	Film	Role	Award	Category	Result
2025	Christmas in Lagos	Film editor	Africa Magic Viewers' Choice Awards	Best Editing	Nominated
2023	Brotherhood	Film editor	Africa Magic Viewers' Choice Awards	Best Editing	Nominated
2023	Gangs of Lagos	Film editor, post-production supervisor	Africa Movie Academy Awards	Best Nigerian Film	Nominated
2022	Road2Blow	Film editor	Africa Magic Viewers' Choice Awards	Best Documentary	Nominated
2020	Nneka the Pretty Serpent	Film editor	Africa Magic Viewers' Choice Awards	Best Movie	Nominated
