= Christmas in Lagos =

Nigerian romantic comedy drama film

- Directed by: Jade Osiberu
- Written by: Jade Osiberu
- Starring: Teniola Aladese; Rayxia Ojo; Shaffy Bello; Shalom C. Obiago; Wale Ojo; Richard Mofe-Damijo
- Cinematography: Jonathan Kyriakou
- Edited by: Olakunle Martini Akande; Afolabi Olalekan
- Music by: Cobhams Asuquo
- Production company: Greoh Studios
- Distributed by: Amazon Prime Video
- Release date: 2024
- Running time: 124 minutes
- Country: Nigeria

Christmas in Lagos is a 2024 Nigerian romantic comedy-drama film written and directed by Jadesola Osiberu. Produced by Greoh Studios, the film explores the vibrant culture of Lagos, Nigeria, during the Christmas season. It features a mix of humor, romance, and family drama and captures the essence of celebrating Christmas in the bustling city. cast members include Richard Mofe-Damijo, Teniola Aladese, Shaffy Bello, Ladipoe, Shalom C. Obiago, Rayxia Ojo, Ebele Okaro-Onyiuke, and Ejike Asiegbu.

The film was filmed in Lagos, Nigeria. Ayra Starr made her acting debut in the production. The film's soundtrack features a selection of Nigerian pop songs. In addition to Starr, the cast includes Adekunle Gold, Liya and WurlD.

Christmas in Lagos premiered at IMAX Lekki Cinema in Lagos, Nigeria, as part of the "Share the Good" campaign sponsored by Knorr. Distributed theatrically by Amazon MGM Studios via Prime Video. it was nominated for 6 Africa Magic Viewers' Choice Awards and won 1, including Best Costume Design.

== Plot summary ==
Fiyin has been in love with her best friend, Elozonam, for years, in secret. The close relationship is made up of numerous shared moments; thus, she is convinced that theirs is a unique connection. Everything takes a wrong turn when Elozonam breaks the news about being engaged to Yagazie, his girlfriend who has only been around for eight months now. During Christmas, Fiyin is caught in a dilemma of either fighting for her best friend or moving on.

On the other hand, Fiyin's cousin, Ivie, comes back to Lagos from London with the intent of enjoying the festive season. After experiencing a failed relationship, she is not interested in matters of the heart. All she needs during this period is fun-filled days with carefree nights and temporary lovers. However, all her plans go wrong after meeting Ajani. A guitarist who works in a delivery job as he pursues his dream of becoming a renowned musician. It is difficult for Ivie to resist the connection due to his unique personality. She is forced to overcome her fear of intimacy.

As for Fiyin's mother, Gbemi, she experiences a romantic dilemma. For many years now, she has been single and is currently at a point where she needs to choose between two people. The first one is Zachariah Dozie, a wealthy and charming man whom she had been with in the past. The second one is Toye, the man who has been there for her since her marriage fell apart.

== Cast ==
- Teniola Aladese as Fiyin
- Rayxia Ojo as Ivie
- Shaffy Bello as Gbemi
- Shalom C. Obiago as Elozonam
- Wale Ojo as Toye Prince
- Richard Mofe-Damijo as Chief Dozie
- Ladipoe as Ajani
- Ejike Asiegbu as Nonso
- Waje Iruobe as Caroline
- Angelo Anosike as Yagazie
- Ebele Okaro-Onyiuke as Agatha
- Tris Udeh as Ladi
- Obinna Okenwa as Chisom
- Ayra Starr as Herself
- Adekunle Gold as Himself
- WurlD as Himself
- Liya as Herself

== Production ==
Principal photography for Christmas in Lagos began in late January 2024 and concluded in March 2024. Director Jade Osiberu highlighted the effort to maintain authenticity by incorporating real-life events such as concerts and weddings into the production, aiming to represent Lagos’s festive environment with accuracy. The lighting, was led by Matthew Yusuf and One House Lighting Crew, which was highlighted as a standout element, contributing to the film's aesthetic.

== Soundtrack ==
The soundtrack for Christmas in Lagos was composed and produced by Nigerian music producer Cobhams Asuquo and released digitally by Lakeshore Records on December 20, 2024. The music combines elements of Afrobeat, soul, and traditional Christmas melodies to reflect the festive and cultural setting of Lagos during the holiday season. The album features eight tracks, with contributions from Nigerian artists including Adekunle Gold, Waje, WurlD, Liya, ESUA, and Byno. Waje’s version of “Holy Night,” performed with gospel group 121SELAH, was noted for its reinterpretation of the Christmas classic. The track “Fall In Love” by ESUA, which incorporates traditional Nigerian sounds with modern pop, was released as the album’s lead single.

Musical numbers

- "Me Le Se" – Adekunle Gold
- "Fall In Love" – ESUA
- "In the Plane" – Cobhams Asuquo
- "Nwa Baby" – Byno
- "Can I Be Your Guy?" – Cobhams Asuquo
- "Only in Lagos" – WurlD & Liya
- "Holy Night" – Waje & 121SELAH
- "A Better Help" – Cobhams Asuquo

== Release ==
The movie was released in Nigerian cinemas on December 20, 2024 and later made available on streaming platforms like Prime Video. It received widespread acclaim for its authentic portrayal of Lagos and its festive atmosphere.

== Awards and nominations ==
Year	Award	Category	Result	Ref
2025	Africa Magic Viewers' Choice Awards (AMVCA)	Best Movie	Nominated	
2025	Africa Magic Viewers' Choice Awards (AMVCA)	Best Supporting Actor - Richard Mofe-Damijo	Nominated	
2025	Africa Magic Viewers' Choice Awards (AMVCA)	Best Writing (Movie)	Nominated	
2025	Africa Magic Viewers' Choice Awards (AMVCA)	Best Editing	Nominated	
2025	Africa Magic Viewers' Choice Awards (AMVCA)	Best Costume Design	Won	
2025	Africa Magic Viewers' Choice Awards (AMVCA)	Best Art Director	Nominated	
