= Boo of the Booless =

Studio album by Chike
- Released: February 14, 2020
- Genres: R&B; highlife; Afropop
- Length: 46:00
- Languages: English; Nigerian Pidgin; Igbo; Swahili
- Label: Independent
- Producer: Chike Ezekpeazu Osebuka

Chike chronology
Boo of the Booless (2020)	Dance of the Booless (2020)

Boo of the Booless is the debut studio album of Nigerian singer Chike. It was released on February 14, 2020. Chike enlisted Ogaga Sakpaide to A&R the album. Boo of the Booless charted at number 14 on the MTV Base Naija Hottest Albums chart.

== Background ==
The album is 14-tracked and has a total listening time of 46 minutes. It includes folk, R&B, afro-pop, alternative pop and highlife tracks. Chike enlisted producers including DeeYasso, Vtekk, Doron Clinton, Adejames Crack, Blaisemix, Bierdman and Nevmix. It features three artistes; Ric Hassani on "Nakupenda", M.I. Abaga on "Forever" and Zoro on "Watching Over Me".

== Singles and other releases ==
"Beautiful People" was released in 2018. It is described as an alternative song from the depths of Ireland. "Finders Keepers" is a merger of alternative rock riffs with African guitar chords. Chike performed a fast-paced version of this song at his album listening party on February 16, 2020. "Forever" features MI Abaga and is comparable to mid-2000s American R&B both in sound and lyrical delivery. Motolani Alake of Pulse Nigeria describes "Amen" as "wedding music in power, essence and construction".

Chike released a six-track mixtape named Dance of the Booless Volume 1 as a sequel to Boo of the Booless. It was described as a hybrid of Electronic Dance Music (EDM) and experimental Afro-Pop/RnB and contained remixes of songs from Boo of the Booless. He released visuals for "Nakupenda" (featuring Ric Hassani). The video tells a love story using colourful aesthetics and a dramatic storyline. It portrays Chike as a rich client, who competes with a photographer for the love of a female model. It was directed by Ani James and Aje Film Works.

== Critical reception ==
Professional ratings
Review scores
Source	Rating
Nigerian Entertainment Today	8/10
Pulse Nigeria	9.8/10

Boo of the Booless was listed as a top Nigerian album of the year 2020. It was rated 9.8/10 by Motolani Alake of Pulse Nigeria. Chinonso Ihekire of The Guardian described it as "a brilliant debut that has become an instant classic" adding that it has one superpower: "its ability to make you re-listen over and over, eager to always hear melodies and lyrics that interflow like conjugated rivers of music." Akindare Okunola of Nigerian Entertainment Today considered it the best R&B album since Simi's Omo Charlie Champagne and rated it an 8 out of 10. Boo of the Booless was nominated for Album of the Year at the 2020 Headies Awards. Chike was also nominated for the Best Vocal Performance (Male) for "Forgive".

== Track listing ==
All tracks are written by Chike.

No.	Title	Length
1.	"Beautiful People"	2:58
2.	"Nakupenda (featuring Ric Hassani)" (Nakupenda is a Swahili word which means I Love You.)	3:26
3.	"If You No Love"	3:34
4.	"Forever (featuring M.I Abaga)"	3:54
5.	"Amen"	3:40
6.	"Roju" (Roju is portmanteau of Romeo and Juliet)	3:18
7.	"Finders Keepers"	3:22
8.	"Insecure"	3:00
9.	"Out Of Love"	3:26
10.	"Forgive"	3:24
11.	"Faithful"	3:40
12.	"Running"	2:27
13.	"Soldier"	3:03
14.	"Watching Over Me (featuring Zoro)"	3:13
Total length:		46:00
