= Anne Nassanga =

Ugandan musician, filmmaker and advocate (born 1995)

- Born: Ann Maria Nassanga; April 16, 1997 (age 29)
- Other name: Afrie
- Citizenship: Ugandan
- Education: Gayaza High School, Kampala Parents School; Makerere University
- Occupations: Filmmaker, singer, composer, and dental technologist
- Years active: 2017–present
- Organization: Kalaverse
- Known for: Music and Film production

Anne Nassanga or Ann Maria Nassanga (born April 16, 1995) also known as Afrie is a Ugandan filmmaker, singer, composer, philanthropist, and dental psychologist. Her documentary Little Faith won the best documentary film in the Uganda Film Festival. She is also the African Union CIEFFA ambassador for AfricaEducate Her campaign.

== Background and education ==
In 2018, she completed her Bachelor of Science degree in Dental technology from Makerere University. She went to Gayaza High School for her secondary education after completing her primary education from Kampala Parents School.

== Career ==
She established the Cal-verse, an initiative aimed at mentoring and supporting young female creatives. She was an accountant at Aquila. She started her music career in 2017 with her first song ''Let her Know''.

== Discography ==
- Mulala
- Like a boss
- Lie
- Dai
- Enuma
- Don't delay
- G.U.N
- Sabalwanyi
- Blessing
- Yodiyodi
- Kalosaa
- Balongo
- Kabaka
- New man
- Mpungu
- Ggulu
- Alleluya
- Her
- Let her know
- Over and Above
- Your girl
- Go to school
- Askari
- Little Faith
- Ali nange

=== Collaboration ===
- Gusula wano with Kenneth Mugabi

=== Films ===
- Little Faith

== Awards and nominations ==
She won the best Afro fusion song award and has been nominated for the All-Africa Music Awards (AFRIMA) 2019 and 2021 awards four times. At the Uganda Film Festival, she was awarded best documentary film for her project Little Faith.

== See also ==
- Loukman Ali
- Ndagire Mariam
