= Chike =

Chike or Chiké is an Igbo masculine given name. Notable people with the name include:

- Chike (singer) or Chike-Ezekpeazu Osebuka, Nigerian singer, runner up in The Voice Nigeria
- Chike Aniakor (born 1939), Nigerian painter
- Chike Augustine (born 1992), Trinidad and Tobago basketball player
- Chike Lindsay (born 1983), American kickboxer
- Chike Nwoffiah (born 1965), Nigerian actor and film director
- Chike Obi (1921–2008), Nigerian politician, mathematician and academic
- Chike Okeafor (born 1976), American football player
- Chike Onyejekwe (born 1986), Romanian handball player
- Chike Ozah (born 1978), American film director, screenwriter, cinematographer, and producer, of duo Coodie & Chike
