= Maurice Kirya =

Ugandan musician and actor (born 1984)

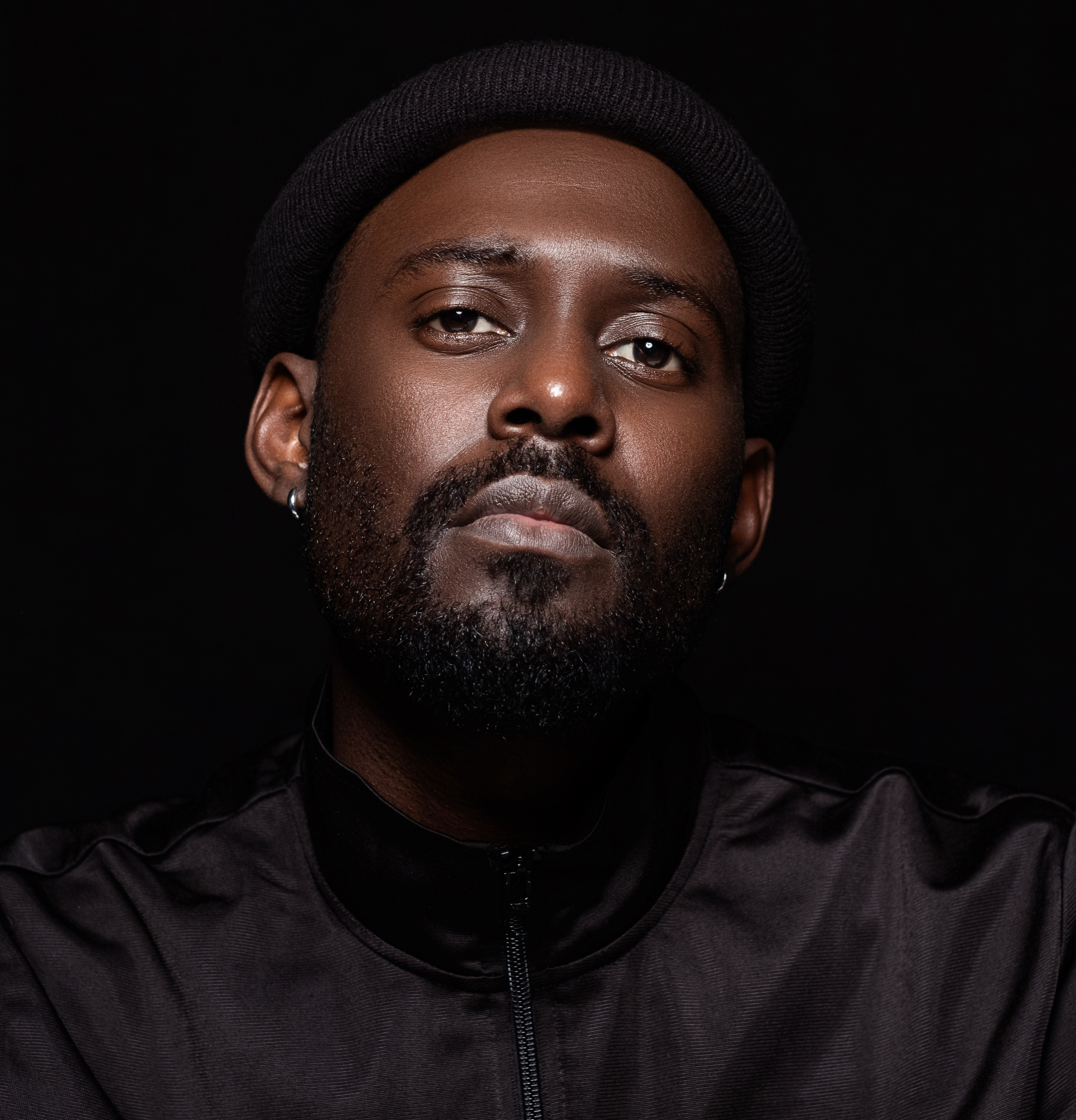
- Kirya in 2019

Background information
- Born: 4 November 1984 (age 41); Uganda
- Occupations: Musician; actor; businessman
- Years active: 2002–present
- Label: Indie
- Website: http://www.mauricekirya.com

Maurice Kirya (born 4 November 1984) is a Ugandan singer, songwriter, actor, and humanitarian. .He is the CEO and founder of Piz & Pots, a Ugandan-based branding agency which runs the annual music festival Kiryalive in Kampala.

== Early life and education ==
Kirya was born on 4 November 1984 to Tonny Munobbi and Sophie Baguma in Jinja. He was raised in Najjanakumbi, a Kampala suburb, but the family kept shifting to the different suburbs of the city. He ended up attending nine primary schools but finally completed his primary at Nakivubo Blue Primary School.

Kirya attended St Joseph's Secondary School Ndeeba for his O Level education before switching to Kampala Citizens College, where he completed his A level. He later attended Maisha Film School.

== Career ==
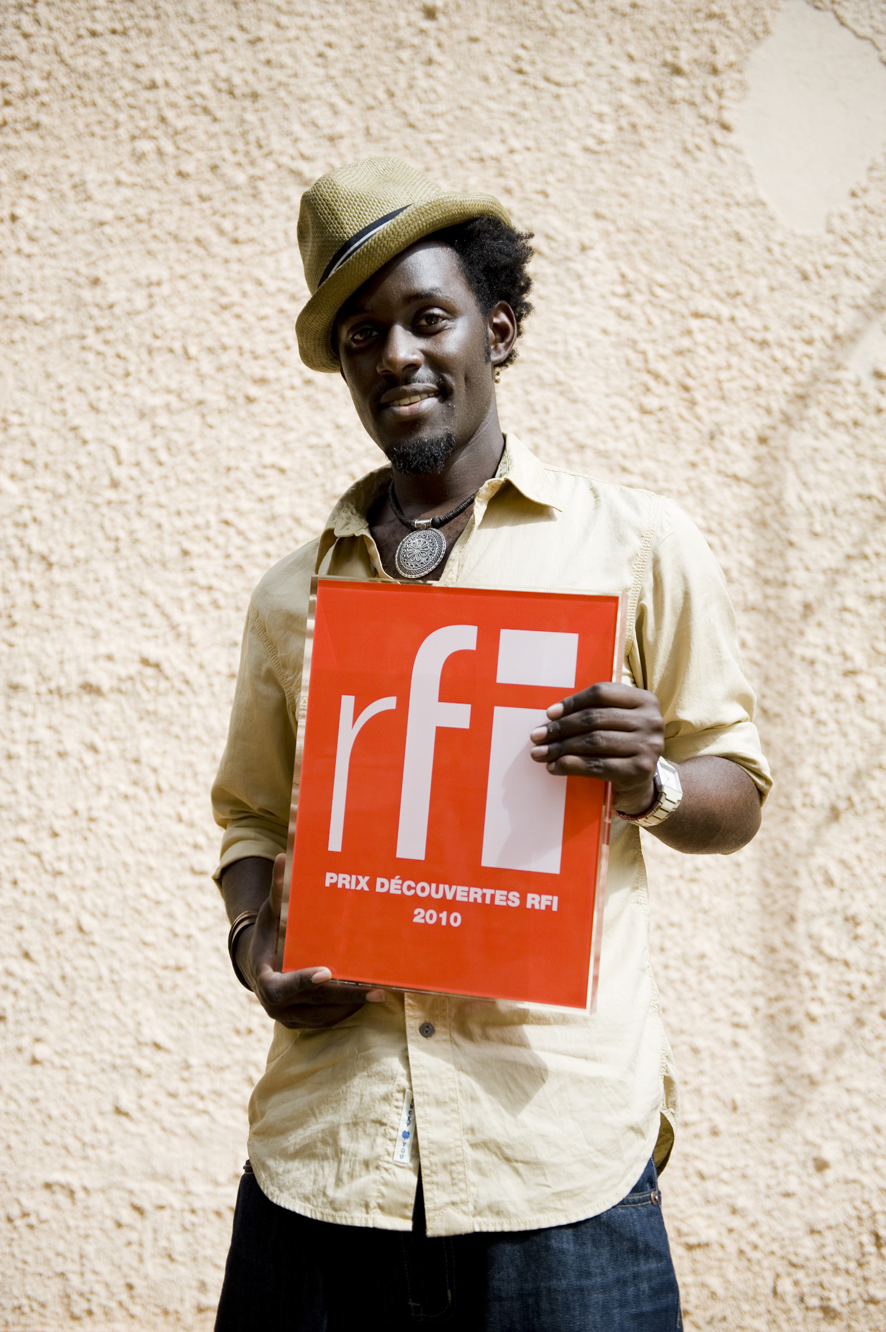
Kirya in 2010, holding his RFI Discovery Award

Kirya performed in the street, and he and his older brother performed as a duo in clubs. In 2005 he was nominated for a KISIMA Award in Kenya. He studied acting at the Maisha Film School in Uganda.

Kirya was named as a Wild Aid ambassador for wildlife conservation. As a musician and actor, he won Radio France International's 2010 Discoveries Music Award. He staged performances in Paris and did a year-long tour of Africa during which he toured over 35 countries. He was nominated for the most gifted afro pop video of the year in the 2012 channel O video music awards. He was one of the three Ugandan artists to perform at the inaugural annual Tribe One Festival in South Africa.

== Discography ==
=== Albums ===
- Misubbaawa, 2009
- The Book of Kirya, 2012
- Mwooyo, 2015
- Free Dreams, 2016
- Beyond Myself, 2019
- The Road to Kirya, 2022
- This is Happening, 2025

=== Singles ===
- To Love You
- Munonde
- Gimme Light
- So Cold
- Busaabala
- Never Been Loved
- Njagala gwe
- Njagala gwe Rmx
- Beera Naabo
- Beera Naabo Rmx
- Binadamu featuring AY
- Let’s go!
- Stop
- Stop RMX
- Boda Boda
- Tell Me
- Village girl featuring Valerie Kimani
- Locals and native feat Indigenous
- Revolution
- Revolution Rmx feat Navio & Da myth
- Silent Night
- Work it out
- Bemoola
- Money
- Hold on and holy ghost ft Ruyonga

== Filmography ==
- The Last King of Scotland (2006)
- The Queen of Katwe (2016) as Theo
- The Girl in the Yellow Jumper (2020) as Patrick Asimwe
- Live Joseph
- Sins of the Parents (2008) as Peter
- The Hostel TV series as Luke Okwalinga
