= Ejike Asiegbu =

Nigerian film actor and film director

- Born: Ejike Asiegbu; 8 November 1959 (age 66); Nigeria
- Education: University of Port Harcourt
- Occupation: Actor
- Years active: 1996-present

Ejike Asiegbu // (born 8 November 1959) is a Nigerian actor and filmmaker who served as president of the Actors Guild of Nigeria from 2005 to 2009. He previously worked as a personal assistant to former Biafran leader Odumegwu Ojukwu during the 1994 National Constitutional Conference held in Abuja.

== Early life and education ==
Asiegbu was born on 8 November 1959 in Umuahia. He began his primary education at Constitution Crescent Primary School, Aba, and completed it at St. Mary's Primary School, Lokoja. He attended Abdul Azeez Attah Memorial College, Okene, before completing his secondary education at Christ the King College, Onitsha, in 1980. He later graduated from the University of Port Harcourt in 1993 with a bachelor's degree in theatre arts.

== Career ==
Asiegbu joined the Nigerian film industry (Nollywood) in 1996 and made his acting debut in the film Silent Night, which brought him to prominence. He is known for appearing mainly in action films alongside Pete Edochie, Clem Ohameze, Kanayo O Kanayo and Kenneth Okonkwo.

== Awards ==
Asiegbu has won several awards, including:

- Best Actor of the Year at the Africa Magic Viewers' Choice Awards (AMVCA)
- Best Actor in Nigeria at the City People Entertainment Awards
- Best Actor in a Leading Role at the Best of Nollywood Awards
- Most Prominent Actor in Nigeria at the Africa Movie Academy Awards

== Personal life ==
Asiegbu is married to Ogechi Asiegbu, and they have four children.

== Filmography ==
- Christmas in Lagos (2024) as Nonso
- Sword of God (2024) as Chief Alex
- Zarz End (2023)
- Glamour Girls (2022) as Chief Nkem
- Pushback (2021) as Papa
- The Silent Baron (2021)
- RattleSnake: The Ahanna Story (2020) as politician
- Eyimofe (2020) as Goddey
- She Is (2019) as Chief Anyaoku
- Gossip Nation (2012) as Kabaka's father-in-law
- The Wrong Money (2008) as Mr. Benson
- Silent Whispers (2007)
- Be My Val (2006) as Smith
- Last Kiss (2006)
- Power Has Changed Hands (2006)
- Power Must Change Hands (2006)
- The Wolves (2006) as faculty officer
- Squad Twenty-Three (2005) as Bimbo
- Executive Connection (2005)
- End of Money (2005) as Collins
- The Barons (2005)
- Too Much Money (2005)
- A Time to Die (2005)
- Abuja Boys (2004)
- Beyond Reason (2004) as Dr. Mike
- When God Says Yes (2003) as Martin
- Borderline (2001)
- Dirty Game (2000)
- State of Emergency (2000) as chief inspector
- Elastic Limit (2000) as Jimmy
- The Price (1999) as Charles
- Holy Crime (1999) as Prophet Mazumba
- Oracle (1998)
- Blood Money (1997) as boss
- Rituals (1997)
- Silent Night (1996)
- Nneka the Pretty Serpent 2 (1995)
