= Isoken =

2017 romantic comedy film

- Theatrical release poster
- Directed by: Jadesola Osiberu
- Screenplay by: Jadesola Osiberu
- Produced by: Jadesola Osiberu
- Starring: Dakore Akande; Joseph Benjamin; Marc Rhys; Funke Akindele; Lydia Forson; Jemima Osunde; Damilola Adegbite
- Cinematography: Adekunle Adejuyigbe
- Edited by: Adekunle Adejuyigbe
- Music by: Gray Jones Ossai
- Production company: Tribe 85 productions
- Distributed by: Silverbird Distributions (Nigeria); Evrit Film (United Kingdom)
- Release dates: 24 May 2017 (United Kingdom); 16 June 2017 (Nigeria)
- Running time: 98 minutes
- Country: Nigeria
- Language: English
- Box office: ₦95 million

Isoken is a 2017 Nigerian romantic comedy-drama film written and directed by Jadesola Osiberu, in her directorial debut. The film stars Dakore Akande, Joseph Benjamin, and Marc Rhys.

The film was produced by Tribe85 productions and distributed by Silverbird Distributions in Nigeria and Evrit film in the UK. It premiered in the United Kingdom on 24 May 2017 at the West End's Cineworld in London and then in Nigeria on 16 June 2017 at the Landmark Event Center, Victoria Island, Lagos. The film is one of the creative industry projects under the NollyFund loan scheme supported by the Bank of Industry.

== Plot summary ==
Everyone in the Osayande family worries about Isoken. Although she has what appears to be a perfect life—she is beautiful, successful and surrounded by a great family and friends—yet Isoken is still unmarried at 34 which, in a culture obsessed with marriage, is a serious cause for concern. Things come to a head at her youngest sister's wedding when her overbearing mother thrusts her into an orchestrated matchmaking with the ultimate Edo man, Osaze. Osaze is handsome, successful, and from a good family, making him the perfect Nigerian husband material. But in an unexpected turn of events, Isoken meets Kevin, who she finds herself falling in love with, and he just might be what she truly wants in a partner. The only problem is, not only is he not an Edo man, he is Oyinbo (white). Isoken is a romantic comedy that explores cultural expectations, racial stereotypes and the bonds that unite families in touching, dramatic, and comedic ways.

== Cast ==
- Dakore Akande as Isoken
- Joseph Benjamin as Osaze
- Marc Rhys as Kevin
- Funke Akindele as Agnes
- Lydia Forson as Kukua
- Damilola Adegbite as Joke
- Tina Mba as mama Isoken
- Patrick Doyle as Papa Isoken
- Nedu Wazobia as Chuks
- Jemima Osunde as Osato
- Bolanle Olukanni as Rume
- Rita Edwards as Aunty
- Omasan Buwa as Aunty Adesuwa
- Chris Iheuwa as Uncle Mike
- Abayomi Alvin as Nosa
- Abimbola Craig as Yinka
- Ayoola Ayolola as Seye
- Efa Iwara as Osato's husband
- Tosan Edremoda Ugbeye as Sister Itohan
- Namisi Govin Emma as Issa

== Critical reception ==
The movie was met with a lot of positive reviews. Although Nollywood Reinvented rated the movie 64%, they also state that if there's any one word befitting of describing this movie it would be "beautiful"

Isoken went on to gather several nominations and awards, winning the 2018 AMVCA Best Film West African and the Director, Best Foreign Film at the BronzeLens Film Festival 2018 in Atlanta and the Prix du Public at Nollywood Week Paris, also in 2018. Isoken established Jadesola as not just a film Director, but an award-winning director.

=== Awards ===
Year	Award	Category	Result	Ref
2018	Africa Magic Viewers' Choice Awards	Best Movie West Africa	Won	
2018	Africa Magic Viewers' Choice Awards	Best Director - Jade Osiberu	Won	
2018	Africa Magic Viewers' Choice Awards	Best Supporting Actress - Lydia Forson	Won	
2018	Africa Magic Viewers' Choice Awards	Best Film	Nominated	
2018	Africa Magic Viewers' Choice Awards	Best Costume Designer - Jade Osiberu	Nominated	
2018	Africa Magic Viewers' Choice Awards	Best Art Director - Jade Osiberu	Nominated	
2018	Africa Magic Viewers' Choice Awards	Best Actress in a Comedy - Dakore Akande	Nominated	
2018	African Movie Academy Awards	Best Nigerian Film	Won	
2018	African Movie Academy Awards	Best Actress (Lead role) - Dakore Akande	Won	
2018	African Movie Academy Awards	Achievement in Costume Design	Won	
2018	African Movie Academy Awards	Best Film	Nominated	
2018	African Movie Academy Awards	Best Director - Jade Osiberu	Nominated	
2018	African Movie Academy Awards	Best First Feature Film by a Director - Jade Osiberu	Nominated	
2018	African Movie Academy Awards	Best Soundtrack	Nominated	

== See also ==
- List of Nigerian films of 2017
