= The Bad Mexican =

2017 Ugandan film

The Bad Mexican is a 2017 Ugandan short comedy film written and directed by Loukman Ali. It stars Adnan Senkumba who plays Kenneth Senkumba. The film has dialogue in English, Luganda and Lugbara though captioned.

== Plot ==
The film opens with the caption: "Unfortunately this is a true story..." and skylines of Kampala City. Kenneth Senkumba (Adnan Senkumba) dreams of submitting his award-worthy script entitled The Bad Mexican to an influential producer at the Masters Music office so that he can make money. He dreams that it will be more than enough to refund Moses (played by Joel Okuyo Atiku) in full and also enjoy himself at the beach with girls. Despite paying the "thug" for the past eight months, the money keeps accumulating. Ken owes him $300 and he always collects. While driving himself to deliver the script, Kenneth parks after his friend tells him by telephone that Moses wants him and he had given him Ken's number; he would rather kill himself than let Moses torture him. Ken's stomach starts grumbling because of the bad Mexican food he had eaten as recommended by the friend. He defecates in his pants and has to change them in time for the presentation. His friend (advised by Jess - a girlfriend sitting on a sofa and watching TV) tries telling him to contact a company called Trendz that delivers clothes by GPS but because of bugs in their app a motorcycle courier instead delivers a grey French cap (nkofira) worth 20,000 UgX. Disappointed, Ken is forced to pay the young lad, who had earlier splashed water on from a pothole puddle in an industrial area, for his multi-coloured "ugly trousers". The boy walks away happy in his boxe shorts with some cash in hand. After submitting his script in a khaki envelope, a lady gives him a number and tells him not to call it but rather they would use it to call him if he is selected. The following day, Moses holding a bat and his three goons start looking for Ken at his apartment block.

== Screenings and reception ==
The Bad Mexican has been screened at various film festivals including the Zanzibar International Film Festival (ZIFF) and the Ngalabi Short Film Festival.
