= 21 Bridges =

2019 American action thriller film by Brian Kirk

- Theatrical release poster
- Directed by: Brian Kirk
- Screenplay by: Adam Mervis; Matthew Michael Carnahan
- Story by: Adam Mervis
- Produced by: Anthony Russo Joe Russo; Mike Larocca; Robert Simonds; Gigi Pritzker; Chadwick Boseman; Logan Coles
- Starring: Chadwick Boseman; Sienna Miller; Stephan James; Keith David; Taylor Kitsch; J. K. Simmons
- Cinematography: Paul Cameron
- Edited by: Tim Murrell
- Music by: Henry Jackman; Alex Belcher
- Production companies: MWM Studios; H. Brothers; AGBO; X-Ception Content
- Distributed by: STXfilms
- Release date: November 22, 2019
- Running time: 100 minutes
- Country: United States
- Language: English
- Budget: $33 million
- Box office: $49.9 million

21 Bridges is a 2019 American action-thriller film directed by Brian Kirk and written by Adam Mervis and Matthew Michael Carnahan. The film stars Chadwick Boseman as an NYPD Detective who shuts down the 21 river crossings of Manhattan to find two suspected cop killers, portrayed by Stephan James and Taylor Kitsch. Sienna Miller, Keith David and J. K. Simmons appear in supporting roles. The film was produced by brothers Joe Russo and Anthony Russo, Mike Larocca, Robert Simonds, Gigi Pritzker, Boseman (in his only producing credit) and Logan Coles. It was also Boseman's final theatrical film before his death in August 2020. Boseman's last two films Da 5 Bloods and Ma Rainey's Black Bottom were released on Netflix.

The project was announced as 17 Bridges in July 2018. Principal photography began on September 24, 2018, in New York City, primarily Brooklyn and also took place in Philadelphia, Pennsylvania. Several members of the cast joined the film in October 2018, including James and David.

21 Bridges was theatrically released in the United States on November 22, 2019 by STXfilms. It received mixed reviews from critics and grossed $49 million worldwide on a $33 million production budget.

== Plot ==
Andre Davis, a successful NYPD Detective like his father (who was murdered on duty when Andre was a child), struggles with his father's legacy and has earned a reputation for killing several criminals over the years, although he claims that they were all in self-defense and is uncomfortable with the label.

One night, Michael Trujillo and Ray Jackson, two small-time criminals and ex-military soldiers, attempt to steal 30 kilograms of cocaine from a wine shop in Brooklyn, but they find 300 kilograms of cocaine instead. When a group of officers from the NYPD's 85th Precinct arrives, Ray guns them down in a shootout, killing seven officers and wounding another, who later dies at a hospital. After Michael and Ray escape into Manhattan with 50 kilograms, Michael chastises Ray for putting them in jeopardy by killing cops. Assigned to the case, Davis and NYPD Narcotics Detective Frankie Burns come into conflict with the Deputy Mayor, who attempts to allow FBI special agents to take over the case. Reasoning that the criminals would have to sell the cocaine in Manhattan before escaping the state, Davis secures the reluctant approval of the Deputy Mayor, FBI and the precinct's head Captain McKenna for Manhattan Island to be under lockdown until 5:00 a.m.

As Ray and Michael go with their liaison, Toriano Bush, to meet their buyer Hawk, who gives them $1 million, Davis and Burns get info from a woman and manage to identify all three of them. Bush is soon gunned down by Sgt. Butchco and Sgt. Dugan in a nightclub without a warning. After catching Butchco planting his backup sidearm on Bush's body and briefly scuffling with him, Davis becomes more suspicious of his colleagues. Adi, a money launderer, gives new identities to Michael and Ray and tells them to depart for Miami. However, before he can secure their money in an offshore account, a team of NYPD officers led by Lt. Kelly manages to locate and raid his apartment. Adi is mortally wounded, but gives Michael two flash drives and their password.

Davis and Burns catch up to Michael and Ray after accidentally killing a civilian, Ray is fatally wounded by Davis. Michael holds Burns at gunpoint, telling Davis about the drives and how suspicious everything is, before escaping. Burns scolds Davis for letting Michael escape despite Davis' reputation. In a hotel room, Michael unlocks the drives, realizing that McKenna's precinct was involved in trafficking the drugs from the winery and earning profits for it and that some of the cops he and Ray had killed in the shootout had been corrupt. After another chase where Michael abandons his money, Davis manages to corner him on a subway train and convinces him to surrender, promising to keep him alive. Burns, who has also boarded the train, suddenly shoots Michael, claiming that when he berates her, she thought Michael was still holding Davis at gunpoint. Michael secretly gives Davis the drives and password before dying. As the police congratulate the two for their efforts, Davis discovers that Burns had contacted Kelly before Adi's apartment was raided.

The next morning, McKenna returns home to find Davis holding him at gunpoint, having accessed the drives. McKenna explains that the officers went into drug trafficking because they were struggling to survive on a measly pay. Davis refuses to walk away, citing the trial of one of his father's killers when stating drugs are a major cause of people dying. He kills the arriving Butchco, Dugan, and Kelly – who were all on McKenna's payroll – and later kills McKenna, who refuses to surrender. Burns, who Davis deduced was also allied with McKenna, appears from behind and holds Davis at gunpoint. Davis reveals that he has already leaked the information online, exposing all the corrupt cops in New York, and warns her that she will get life in prison for killing him, meaning that her daughter would have to grow up without her, so Burns surrenders.

In the aftermath, Davis solemnly drives along the Manhattan Bridge in the sunset, taking the drives with him.

== Cast ==
- Chadwick Boseman as Andre Davis
  - Christian Isaiah as young Andre Davis
- Sienna Miller as Frankie Burns
- Stephan James as Michael Trujillo
- Keith David as Deputy Chief Spencer
- Alexander Siddig as Adi
- Taylor Kitsch as Raymond "Ray" Jackson
- J. K. Simmons as Captain McKenna
- Louis Cancelmi as Toriano Bush
- Victoria Cartagena as Sergeant Yolanda Bell
- Gary Carr as Hawk Tyler
- Morocco Omari as Deputy Mayor Antonie Mott
- Chris Ghaffari as Brad Gales
- Dale Pavinski as Tom Cheaver
- Darren Lipari as Lt. Kelly
- Adriane Lenox as Vonetta Davis
  - Sarah Ellen Stephens as young Vonetta Davis
- Jamie Neumann as Leigh
- Obi Abili as Sgt. Butchco
- Andy Truschinski as Sgt. Dugan

== Production ==
On July 11, 2018, it was announced that Chadwick Boseman would star in the film, then known under the title 17 Bridges, with Brian Kirk directing. J. K. Simmons, Sienna Miller and Taylor Kitsch were cast in September. Chris Pratt, Andrew Koji, Will Yun Lee, and Lewis Tan were also considered for roles.

Filming began on September 24, with production occurring between New York City and Philadelphia. Keith David, Morocco Omari, Stephan James and Jamie Neumann joined in October 2018. Sienna Miller would later reveal just after Chadwick Boseman's death that Boseman donated part of his salary to her in order to have her fairly compensated when STX did not meet her requested pay.

Henry Jackman and Alex Belcher composed the film score, with the soundtrack being released by Sony Classical Records.

== Release ==
21 Bridges was released in the United States and Canada on November 22, 2019. It was previously scheduled to be released on July 12 and September 27, 2019.

=== Home media ===
The film was released in digital download on February 4, 2020, and also released on DVD and Blu-ray on February 18, 2020. Over its first two weeks of release the film totaled $3.2 million in sales.

== Reception ==
=== Box office ===
21 Bridges grossed $28.5 million in the United States and Canada, and $21.4 million in other territories, for a worldwide total of $49.9 million, against a production budget of $33 million.

In the United States and Canada, the film was released alongside A Beautiful Day in the Neighborhood and Frozen 2, and was projected to gross $10–12 million from 2,655 theaters in its opening weekend. The film made $3.3 million on its first day, including $770,000 from Thursday night previews. It went on to debut at $9.3 million, finishing fourth at the box office. The film fell 37% in its second weekend, making $5.8 million and finishing sixth.

=== Critical response ===
On the review aggregator website Rotten Tomatoes, 55% of 139 critics' reviews are positive, with an average rating of 5.5/10. The website's consensus reads: "21 Bridges covers its beat competently enough, but given its impressive cast, this cop thriller should be more arresting than it is." Metacritic, which uses a weighted average, assigned the film a score of 51 out of 100, based on 32 critics, indicating "mixed or average" reviews. Audiences polled by CinemaScore gave the film an average grade of "B+" on an A+ to F scale, while those at PostTrak gave it an average 4 out of 5 stars, with 57% saying they would recommend it.

== See also ==
- Black and Blue
- Films set in New York City
- List of black films of the 2010s
- Run All Night
- The Siege
