= Hamiid Wonda =

Nigerian music executive

- Born: Hamiid Abaniwonda; April 12, 1998 (age 28); Lagos
- Education: Pan-Atlantic University
- Occupations: Talent manager; A&R; promoter; record executive
- Years active: 2016–present
- Known for: Wuta Entertainment

Hamiid Abaniwonda (born 12 April 1998), professionally known as Hamiid Wonda, is a Nigerian music executive and entrepreneur. He is the founder of Wuta Entertainment and Soniq Hill, and serves as the Vice President of Liaising and Talent Acquisition at The Plug.

== Early life and education ==
Abaniwonda was born on 12 April 1998 in Lagos, Nigeria, to Bolanle and Fuad Abaniwonda, both accountants. He is the second of three children and grew up in Gbagada, Lagos. He attended Grace Children School, where he participated in the school choir and drum band. He completed his secondary education at Whitesands School. He later studied Media and Communication at the Pan-Atlantic University in Lagos.

== Career ==
Wonda began his career in 2014 as Jinmi Abduls manager, He executive produced Abduls' debut EP, JOLAG, and was responsible for the release of several records, including "Saro," "Greed" featuring Oxlade, and "Iyawo Jinmi," . In 2019, Wonda negotiated a recording deal between Jinmi Abduls and Universal Music Group Nigeria. In 2021 he won the Best Artist Manager at The Beatz Awards.

He has managed many Nigerian musicians and producers including NYRP and Liya In 2023 He was honored at the Maya Award Africa alongside Don Jazzy, Muyiwa Awoniyi and ranks among the top 10 Nigerian Music Executives of 2023 by The Sun Through Soniq Hill, Wonda secured a marketing partnership with Roc Nation for DJ Obi's 2024 single "Take Me Away." The company also began representing Maze & Mxtreme.

In 2024, Wonda was appointed Vice President of Liaising and Talent Acquisition at The Plug and was listed among 10 influential Nigerian music managers by Vanguard.
