= Mpeke Town =

Ugandan television series

- Genre: Family Drama
- Written by: Philip Luswata
- Directed by: Shani Grewal
- Starring: Stephen Katusiime; Patience Nakamya; Frobisher Lwanga; Oyenbot; Michael Musoke; Philip Luswata; Hellen Lukoma
- Country of origin: Uganda
- Original languages: English; Luganda
- No. of seasons: 1
- No. of episodes: 13

Production
- Producer: Patricia Gichinga
- Editor: Esther Kintu
- Camera setup: Alternative Two Camera
- Running time: 30 minutes
- Production company: The Mediae Company

Original release
- Network: Urban TV Uganda; Bukedde TV
- Release: 11 June – 12 September 2018

Mpeke Town is a Ugandan-Kenyan television and radio drama series that premiered in Uganda on June 11, 2018. The first season of the series aired on Urban TV Uganda in English, Bukedde TV and Bukedde radio in Luganda. It was produced by Kenyan producer Patricia Gichinga under Kenyan production company The Mediae Company known for Shamba Shape Up and Makutano Junction.

== Plot ==
Having failed at success in the big city, Isaiah returns to his little village town Kabulondo Mpeke where his encounter with the determined Isabella thrusts him into a whirlwind of possibility and he discovers the untapped potential in agribusiness.

== Cast ==
The series is made up of an ensemble cast of Stephen Katusiime, Patience Nakamya, Frobisher Lwanga, Oyenbot, Michael Musoke, Philip Luswata, Hellen Lukoma.

== Episodes ==
=== Series overview ===
Season	Episodes	Originally released	
Season	Episodes	First released	Last released
1	13	June 11, 2018	September 12, 2018

=== Season 1 ===
No. overall	No. in season	Title	Directed by	Written by	Original release date
1	1	"New Dawn"	Shani Grewal	Philip Luswata	June 11, 2018
Isaiah struggles to make a living in the city while riding a boda boda. He has to return home to Kabulondo Mpeke when he almost loses his life in a motor cycle robbery and his boda boda is stolen.
2	2	"Gone Bananas"	Shani Grewal	Philip Luswata	TBA
3	3	"Loan Me Not"	Shani Grewal	Philip Luswata	TBA
4	4	"Love Kick"	Shani Grewal	Philip Luswata	TBA
5	5	"Machiavellians"	Shani Grewal	Philip Luswata	TBA
6	6	"Coffee Bail"	Shani Grewal	Philip Luswata	TBA
7	7	"Togethet As One"	Shani Grewal	Philip Luswata	TBA
8	8	"New Beginnings"	Shani Grewal	Philip Luswata	TBA
9	9	"Let's Go Dancing"	Shani Grewal	Philip Luswata	TBA
10	10	"Every Dog Has His Day"	Shani Grewal	Philip Luswata	TBA
11	12	"Beyond What We See"	Shani Grewal	Philip Luswata	TBA
12	12	"Toast To The Future"	Shani Grewal	Philip Luswata	TBA
13	14	"Love Hurdles"	Shani Grewal	Philip Luswata	TBA
