= Kyenvu =

- Directed by: Kemiyondo Coutinho
- Written by: Kemiyondo Coutinho
- Produced by: Heddwyn Kyambadde, Gladys Oyenbot, Kemiyondo Coutinho
- Starring: Kemiyondo Coutinho; Michael Wawuyo Jr.; Rehema Nanfuka; Joel Okuyo Prynce; Bwanika Baale Felix
- Edited by: Peter Mukiibi
- Music by: Ahuurra Andrew
- Release date: 2018
- Running time: 20 minutes
- Country: Uganda
- Language: English

Kyenvu is a 2018 Ugandan short film written, produced and directed by Kemiyondo Coutinho . Starring Kemiyondo Coutinho and Michael Wawuyo Jr. in lead roles and supported by Rehema Nanfuka (Taxi Gossip), Joel Okuyo Atiku (MAN), Bwanika Bale Felix (Man), Andrew Kiyegga (Taxi Conductor), Yusuf Boxa Kaija (Luda Guy) and others. The film is Kemiyondo Coutinho’s directorial and production début and won the Pan African Film Festival (PAFF)’s Best Narrative Short Film.

== Premise ==
A recently returned brown (yellow) girl is tipped off by a passenger guy in a taxi when the taxi conductor tries to cheat her. The passenger offers to pay her fare and what follows is a game of cat and mouse between the girl and the guy.

== Production ==
Kyenvu is set in a taxi, a 14 seater matatu. According to Kemiyondo Coutinho, girls are ridiculed for their dressing in taxis, roadsides and everywhere. She wrote Kyenvu in 2014 when the "Anti-Pornography" had passed in Uganda. Kyenvu is a Luganda word meaning yellow colour, which is used as a metaphor in the film and generally in Uganda to describe a brown girl. The film uses colour to expose the problems faced by girls of a different colour shed. Browner girls are prone to a number of challenges including catcalls, gang rapes, groping and so on. The film was edited by Peter Mukiibi alongside Isaac Ekuka as the director of photography and Moses Bwayo as the director of Audiography

== Music ==
Kyenvu uses accurate scoring, soundtracks and original compositions. The songs used were performed by artistes that had previously performed at her A Ka Dope sessions.

== Awards ==
Awards
Year	Award	Category	Result
2018	Pan African Film Festival (PAFF awards)	Best Narrative Short	Won
2018	Uganda Film Festival Awards	Best Actress	Nominated
