= Sixteen Rounds =

Ugandan short film

- Directed by: Loukman Ali
- Screenplay by: Loukman Ali
- Produced by: Usama Mukwaya, Loukman Ali
- Starring: Natasha Sinayobye; Michael Wawuyo Jr.; Aganza Prince; Jack Sserunkuma
- Cinematography: Loukman Ali
- Music by: Ahuurra Andrew
- Production company: Loukout Films
- Release date: 16 September 2021 (Youtube)
- Running time: 37 minutes
- Country: Uganda
- Language: English

Sixteen Rounds is a 2021 Ugandan film written and directed by Loukman Ali starring Michael Wawuyo Jr. and Natasha Sinayobye. The short film premiered on YouTube on September 16, 2021, and marks the second installment to The Blind Date, an anthology of short films between Usama Mukwaya and Loukman Ali. The film's soundtrack is designed by longtime collaborator, Andrew Ahuura and features songs by Keneth Mugabi and Fred Masagazi.

== Plot ==
The film revolves around a former army man Captain Ddamba (Michael Wawuyo Jr.) and his wife Dorothy Natasha Sinayobye and their messy love life characterized by infidelity.

== Cast ==
- Michael Wawuyo Jr. as Captain Ddamba
- Natasha Sinayobye as Dorothy
- Aganza Prince as Jerome
- Jack Sserunkuma as Louis
- River Dan Rugaju as Police Officer
- Patriq Nkakalukanyi
- Raymond Rushabiro

== Feature film adaptation ==
Loukman announced in October that a feature length film titled Ddamba based on the Sixteen Round's story is in the making

== Awards ==
=== Won ===
- 2021: Best Short Film, 7th Mashariki African Film Festival
- 2022: Best Short Film, 43rd Durban International Film Festival

=== Nominated ===
- 2022: Best Short Film, 11th Luxor African Film Festival
- 2022: Best Short Film, 9th Uganda Film Festival Awards
- 2023: Best Short Film, 1st iKON Awards
