= 5 @Home =

- Genre: Drama
- Written by: Kwezi Kaganda
- Directed by: Lloyd Lutara
- Starring: Raymond Rushabiro; Tumusiime Nicole; Jovan Lugave; Alen Komujuni; Arinaitwe Ramadhan; Gladys Oyenbot
- Country of origin: Uganda
- Original language: English
- No. of seasons: 1
- No. of episodes: 26

Production
- Executive producer: Richard Geria
- Producer: Mathew Chan-Piu
- Camera setup: Alternative Two Camera
- Running time: 30 minutes
- Production company: Fastrack Productions

Original release
- Network: Fox Life
- Release: July 14, 2015 – 2018

5 @Home sometimes 5 at Home is a Ugandan drama television series starring Raymond Rushabiro, Tumusiime Nicole, Jovan Lugave, Alen Komujuni, Phiona Dollyiantha, John Wayne Muganza, and Arinaitwe Ramadhan that premiered on Fox Life in July 2017.

== Plot ==
Henry Muwonge is a modern African man, a civil servant whose life is about to turn upside down. The patriarch of a middle-class family living in upscale part of Kampala, he loses his government job because the country is in an economic downturn and government is in deep spending stringency. Henry must reflect this new reality to his family through a series of difficult decisions that downgrade his family from high flying nouveau rich to the fringes of society. It's hard for the family members to get used to living on a limited budget.

== Production and release ==
The series is a production of Fast Track Productions Ltd. The show was initially conceived by Conrad Nkutu as a sitcom designed on the format of the American Club 225, The Cosby Show, the Good Times and such. The show arose from an endline survey for The Hostel whose feedback was that the producers of The Hostel should produce another show, preferably a family show. Because of focus on The Hostel TV series at the time, 5@Home took time to be produced (there was no buyer at the time). In 2014, the new executive producer Richard Geria, took the show off the shelf to production having secured a buyer in NTV Uganda. The production team led by Solaire Munyana reorged the format (from sitcom to include a company moves). This was necessary because the feedback from the survey wanted it.

NTV Uganda later declined to air show the citing difficulties occasioned by the digital migration of all TV stations from analog technology. 5@Home was then given to Cote Ouest to distribute to Africa and beyond. It is from here that Fox life licensed it for its viewers across Africa. It was first released on YouTube on 14 July 2015 and later picked up by Fox Life.

== See also ==
- The Life (2012 Film)
- Yat Madit
- Deception NTV
- Balikoowa in the City
- The Hostel
- Beneath The Lies
