= Marc Rhys =

Award winning actor

Marc Rhys (born Marc Alun Williams; September 8, 1988 in Bridgend, South Wales), is a professional actor and one of the recipients of the 2016 Ian Charleston Award. The youngest son of teachers Nevin and Jean Williams. Trained as an actor in London's Mountview Academy of Theatre Arts graduating with a 2:1 in 2011.

== Early life ==
During education at Pencoed Comprehensive School, Rhys (Williams) showed a talent for sport, playing professional football for Cardiff City FC and Wales Under 21s as well as representing Great Britain in TAGB Tae Kwon Do at the 2006 World Championships - reaching the Quarter-Finals.

Alumni of Bridgend Youth Theatre, Welsh National Opera, National Youth Dance Wales and ATSLI casting.

== Career ==
- Theatr Clwyd's production of "Cyrano De Bergerac" playing Christian opposite Steffan Rhodri. Directed by Phillip Breen for which he was nominated for the Ian Charleson Awards sponsored by The National Theatre and The Sunday Times.
- Nollywood feature film Isoken directed by Jadesola Osiberu. Playing the role of Kevin, the romantic lead - shot in Lagos, Nigeria.
- Maple Dragon's feature film Canaries directed by Peter Stray. Appearing as Tommy opposite a star studded Welsh cast, including Robert Pugh, Craig Russell and Hannah Daniel.
- Sky 1's award-winning series Stella starring Ruth Jones
- "The Wish of My Heart" with Welsh National Opera performed for his Royal Highness The Prince of Wales.
- A run of TV movies on ITV and BBC with "It's my Shout" Films - Bone Orchard, A Night on the Tiles, Down, They Might be Giants and Pleasure Park - with Owen Teale, Richard Harrington, Jan Anderson and Rachel Isaac.
- British Film Institute (BFI) 48 Hour short listed "Accumulation".
- The Viking Epic "Noble Claim" playing the lead role of "Erik Jora" filmed in Snowdonia, Wales. Entered into the 2016 Berlin Film Festival
- Dark comedy "The Two Dogs" starring Desperate Housewives' Gale Harold. Filmed in Los Angeles.
- "Mission Impossible" with Future Cinema, playing the lead role of Ethan Hunt (Made famous by Tom Cruise) playing opposite Elizabeth Hurley.
- Action to the Word's multi-award-winning production of "A Clockwork Orange" touring to Norway & Singapore.
- Creator of the role Lord Arthur Holmwood in Action to the Word's rock opera production of "Dracula".
- "Alice in Wonderland" with SellaDoor at Greenwich Theatre.
- BAFTA Cymru award-winning "Cymru Fach"
- Wales Theatre Company's "A Child's Christmas in Wales" as part of the Dylathon Festival to mark Dylan Thomas' centenary.

== Awards and nominations ==
Nominated for the Ian Charleson Award in 2016 for his role of Christian in Cyrano de Bergerac. Winner of the John Thaw Bursary in 2010.
