= Morocco Omari =

American actor

- Born: May 7, 1975 (age 51); Chicago, Illinois, U.S.
- Occupations: Actor, screenwriter, producer, director
- Years active: 1998–present
- Height: 6 ft 1 in (185 cm)
- Children: 2

Morocco Omari (born May 7, 1975) is an American film, television, and theater actor, screenwriter, producer, and a director. He was born in Chicago, Illinois. He is best known for his role as Tariq in the Hip-Hop television drama series Empire, Chicago Fire on NBC, Prison Break, Homeland on Showtime, Malcolm & Eddie, Early Edition, NCIS on CBS; The Beast, P-Valley, and 24.

He also co-starred in Empire with Terrence Howard and Taraji Henson.

Morocco's film credits also include 21 Bridges, Gun Hill, Half Past Dead 2, Kubuku Rides, and Momentum.

His theater credits include Pipeline, Intimate Apparel, Knock Me a Kiss, and Blues for an Alabama Sky.

Morocco directed Good Intentions, (Mis) Leading Man, and Mission Mom: Possible. He wrote and produced the short film The Male Groupie.

== Early life ==
Morocco grew up on the West Side, Chicago. He says of his early life: "Looking back, I had to be a storyteller; we didn't have a whole lot of outlets on the West Side. But it wasn't until after I was shot at - that I sat down and thought about what I really wanted to do".

== Career ==
Morocco's acting career starting in 1998 after being in the U.S. Marines, and returning from Desert Storm. He appeared in TV series such as Malcolm & Eddie and Early Edition. He had recurring roles in Joan of Arcadia with Patrick Fabian, the television show Dragnet with Chuti Tiu and François Chau, Crossing Jordan and NCIS with Pauley Perrette. He also appeared in Girlfriends, season 1 Episode 2, as the man interested in Toni at Davis’ restaurant.

In films, he has appeared in Constellation and Half Past Dead 2.

As a voice over artist Morocco has worked on campaigns such as Powerade, McDonald's, Budweiser, Sony, The Bible Experience, and Toyota.

== Filmography ==
=== Film ===
| Year | Title | Role | Notes |
|---|---|---|---|
| 2001 | Just Ask My Children | Reporter Banks | TV movie |
| 2001 | A Song for Jade | Douglas Harris | Short |
| 2002 | Shakedown | Tony B | Video |
| 2003 | Hope | Zach | Short |
| 2003 | Momentum | Lincoln | TV movie |
| 2003 | L.A. Dragnet | Detective Latrell | Short |
| 2003 | Jonah | Jonah | Short |
| 2004 | Andre Royo's Big Scene | Hector | Short |
| 2004 | Out-of-Body Experience | Jogger | Short |
| 2004 | A Tale of Two Sisters | Victor Rodriguez | Short |
| 2004 | The Male Groupie | Ton | Short |
| 2005 | Slur | Jordan's Dad | Short |
| 2005 | Constellation | Teacher | |
| 2005 | Squirrel Man | Jalen Wendell | Short |
| 2005 | Exposure | Man | Short |
| 2006 | Hit Me | Hitman | Short |
| 2006 | Results | Chris | Short |
| 2006 | Be the Man | Allen | Short |
| 2006 | Kubuku Rides (This Is It) | Alan | Short |
| 2006 | The Gift A.D. | Adam - Age 32 | Short |
| 2007 | Half Past Dead 2 | J.T. | Video |
| 2008 | (Mis)Leading Man | Keith Holland | Short |
| 2009 | Layla | Christopher Sarani | Short |
| 2009 | Beauty for Ashes | Creed | Short |
| 2009 | Wearing Hitler's Pants | Randolph | Video |
| 2011 | The Package | Davin | Short |
| 2011 | The Lost One | Mr. Oliver | Short |
| 2011 | Chicago | Pharaoh Hunter | Video |
| 2013 | Tune in, Get Out: The Tubby Watts Story | Goldie | Short |
| 2014 | Gun Hill | Bartender | TV movie |
| 2019 | 21 Bridges | Deputy Mayor Mott | |
| 2020 | The Girl in the Yellow Jumper | Expert | |
| 2021 | Wendy Williams: The Movie | Kevin Hunter | TV movie |
| 2021 | All Fruits Ripe | Mr. Mitchell | Short |

=== Television ===
| Year | Title | Role | Notes |
|---|---|---|---|
| 1998 | Early Edition | Johnson | Episode: "Lt. Hobson, U.S.N." |
| 1998 | Malcolm & Eddie | JoJo Johnson | Episode: "Requiem for a Lightweight" |
| 1999 | Get Real | Guard | Episode: "Denial" |
| 2000 | Girlfriends | Man at Bar | Episode: "One Night Stand?" |
| 2001 | V.I.P. | Stewart | Episode: "Amazon Val" |
| 2001 | The District | Garvin Battles | Episode: "Don't Fence Me In" |
| 2001 | Girlfriends | Dexter Owens | Episode: "The List" |
| 2002 | The Invisible Man | Heinrich | Episode: "Mere Mortals" |
| 2002 | Frasier | Tow Truck Driver | Episode: "Enemy at the Gate" |
| 2002 | Angel | Spencer | Episode: "The House Always Wins" |
| 2003 | Judging Amy | Wesley Roberts | Episode: "Judging Eric" |
| 2003 | 24 | CTU Helicopter Crewman | Episode: "Day 2: 11:00 p.m.-12:00 a.m." |
| 2003 | L.A. Dragnet | Detective Latrell | Recurring Cast |
| 2003-04 | Joan of Arcadia | Principal Stephen Chadwick | Recurring Cast: Season 1, Guest: Season 2 |
| 2004 | Crossing Jordan | Ruckheiser | Episode: "Missing Pieces" |
| 2005 | Prison Break | Ron | Episode: "Riots, Drills and the Devil: Part 2" |
| 2006 | In Justice | Zack Thompson | Episode: "Victims" |
| 2006 | NCIS | Agent Thomas Survoy | Episode: "Boxed In" |
| 2009 | The Beast | Harris | Episode: "Mercy" |
| 2011 | NCIS | Agent Thomas Survoy | Episode: "Enemy on the Hill" |
| 2013 | Chicago Fire | Detective Ben Vikan | Episode: "Nazdarovya!" & "A Coffin That Small" |
| 2013 | The Good Wife | Greg the Guard | Episode: "Everything Is Ending" |
| 2014 | Person of Interest | Carlson | Episode: "Death Benefit" |
| 2015 | Homeland | Conrad Fuller | Recurring Cast: Season 5 |
| 2016-17 | Empire | Tariq Cousins | Recurring Cast: Season 2, Main Cast: Season 3 |
| 2018 | Blue Bloods | Samson George | Episode: "My Aim Is True" |
| 2018 | Date.Love.Repeat. | Alvin | Episode: "Dating with a Purpose" |
| 2018-19 | The G | Councilman White | Recurring Cast: Season 1-2 |
| 2019 | Live from Lincoln Center | Xavier | Episode: "Pipeline" |
| 2019 | Tales | Chris | Episode: "My Life" |
| 2020-22 | P-Valley | Big L | Recurring Cast: Season 1, Main Cast: Season 2 |
| 2021 | FBI | Frank Dixon | Episode: "Checks and Balances" |
| 2022 | 61st Street | Speak | Recurring Cast: Season 1 |
| 2023 | The Equalizer | John McCall | Episode: "Justified" |

=== Video Game ===
| Year | Title | Role | Notes |
|---|---|---|---|
| 1999 | MechCommander | Hardcase | |

== Awards ==
- American Black Film Festival Award for Best Short Film, The Male Groupie.
- 2009 - Best Short Film from Hollywood Black Film Festival for The (Mis)Leading Man, produced by casting director Sharon King, MJ Allen and Kia J. Goodwin
