= Demarketing =

Tactics to decrease consumption

Demarketing may be considered “unselling” or “marketing in reverse”, which includes general and selective demarketing.

Although the concept of demarketing lacks a precise theoretical definition, it refers to an attempt by the firm to discourage all or some of its customers from making purchases either temporarily or permanently. Since the initial interests in the subject area of how to market strategically in times of shortages began, different viewpoints have been offered as to how the firm should pursue demarketing.

== Definitions of demarketing ==
While there are many definitions of demarketing—the common thread is the intent to decrease demand.

Businessdictionary.com defines demarketing as: Efforts aimed at discouraging (not destroying) the demand for a product which (1) a firm cannot supply in large-enough quantities, or (2) does not want to supply in a certain region where the high costs of distribution or promotion allow only a too little profit margin. Common demarketing strategies include higher prices, scaled-down advertising, and product redesign.

According to Websters dictionary, demarketing is “The use of advertising to decrease demand for a product that is in short supply.”

A few other definitions include one from DictionaryReference.com: “Advertising that urges the public to limit the consumption of a product, as at a time of shortage. Companies can lessen input cost to the product so that the consumer may not buy from them and choose other alternative product since the quality is lessen. Companies can then allot the saved money to other products they offer to gain more sales”

The All Business dictionary defines demarketing as: Marketers attempt to reduce the demand for a product when the demand for the product is greater than the manufacturer's ability to produce it.

== History ==
While demarketing may seem relatively new, it has in fact been around for decades. In 1971 Phillip Kotler and Sidney Levy introduced the expression “demarketing” in a Harvard Business Review article titled “Demarketing, Yes, Demarketing.”

Later in 1973, another article appeared in the Journal of Marketing by Phillip Kotler. Here, Dr. Kotler elaborated on the “current demand level” and the “desired demand level” in the context of marketing. There is “underdemand, adequate demand, and overdemand.” Each demand situation requires different marketing approaches and corresponding tasks. Specifically, where there is overdemand, the marketing task is to reduce demand by “demarketing.” While demarketing reduces the demand without impugning the product, “countermarketing” seeks to destroy the demand for a product that is “unwholesome” on its face, such as “vice” products. Kotler also used the term “unsell” which “may also be viewed as an effort to sell something else.” Ahead of his time, Kotler observed “unselling (or demarketing) has as much social justification in a democracy as does selling.”

Kotler also seemed to have anticipated the rise of “behavioral economics” when he observed in 1973 that “Efforts to turn off demand can profitably draw on certain concepts and theories in psychology” specifically, deconditioning, habit extinction theory, and learning and reinforcement theory.

In 2011, Dr. Kotler teamed up with R. Craig Lefebvre to write Design Thinking, Demarketing and Behavioral Economics: Fostering Interdisciplinary Growth in Social Marketing. “As the growing number of governments, businesses and private funding sources focus on conditions of consumer excess, we see the social marketing paradigm expanding to accommodate this cultural shift to an Age of Demarketing.”

== Reasons for demarketing ==
According to Lefebvre and Kotler (2011) “Demarketing can be viewed as blending all 4Ps of the marketing mix and also aiming for policy changes to nudge and sustain healthier and more socially responsible behavioral choices… (and) deeper understanding of the people we wish to serve, the environments in which they make choices, the market research we conduct and the programs we implement.”

Mikl ́os-Thal and Juanjuan (2011) proposed that sellers use demarketing to strategically manage buyers’ quality perceptions. They observed that consistent with ostensible demarketing, Cialdini (1985) suggests a psychological tendency for humans to want things that are less available. Amaldoss and Jain (2005) show that limited availability satisfies consumers’ need for uniqueness, and Stock and Balachander (2005) demonstrate that scarcity can signal high quality.

Since the invent of demarketing in the 1970s, many different strategies for implementing demarketing have evolved. Traditionally in marketing—which seeks to grow the consumer base and increase the demand for a product or service—the 4 P's are product, price, place/distribution and promotion. The logic then follows that demarketing would adapt this structure to serve the opposite purpose of reducing the consumer base and discouraging demand for a product and service. Instead of increasing availability of a product or service, a demarketing strategy would be to actually restrict availability. Furthermore, demarketing would seek to increase availability of the alternatives and highlight the downside of the product or service, therefore making it less attractive to consumers. To demarket in the pricing arena, the taxes or price might increase with the purpose of shrinking the demand. Advertising can be minimized or eliminated. The placement of a product/service or the size of the consumption space can be strategically changed to reduce the likelihood of consumption. Another strategy would be to promote behavior that does not require the product or service being demarketed.

Demarketing strategies may differ when being used by a private firm versus a government entity. Social marketing strategies have been widely implemented to demarket products or services that are perceived to be harmful or costly to society. Traditional marketing principles also apply to social marketing, which is used to advance or depress a social idea, cause or behavior. Instead of talking about products, social marketing makes a proposition. Instead of discussing placement of a service or product, it deals with accessibility to those services or products. In place of promotion social marketing uses social communication to spread ideas. Rather than price, the costs of involvement are highlighted by social marketing in ways that support their marketing or demarketing message.

Demarketing activities discourage demand. This stands in sharp contrast to the objectives of marketing: create utility and enhance exchanges. In their provocative article "Demarketing, Yes, Demarketing," Kotler and Levy (1971) distinguish three types of demarketing situations.

=== General demarketing ===
General demarketing occurs when a seller shrinks the level of total demand. Suppliers of electricity and water use advertisements and publicity campaigns during periods of excess demand.

=== Selective demarketing ===
Selective demarketing occurs when a company discourages demand from certain classes of consumers. Adult communities demarket properties to families with children, and producers of goods with a snob appeal avoid low-image retailers.

=== Ostensible demarketing ===
Ostensible demarketing occurs when a seller creates an artificial or perceived shortage to whet consumer appetites. Limited distribution of goods may induce consumers to stockpile these “hard-to-get" items.

Although Kotler and Levy (1971) emphasized the need for careful research into these phenomena, little effort has been devoted to the formal study of demarketing by marketers. This is not surprising, as marketers are trained to build demand rather than destroy it.

== Strategies ==
=== Price discriminating demarketing ===
Salop (1977), Chiang and Spatt (1982), Narasimhan (1984), and Gerstner and Holthausen (1986) have shown that price discriminating firms may create transaction costs deliberately to discourage consumers from seeking the lowest price. Busy consumers pay higher prices, whereas those with small transaction costs pay lower prices. For example, some retailers hold "3-hour sales" from 8 to 11 Saturday morning. Consumers who get to the store before 11:00 am pay lower prices but incur the inconvenience of early morning shopping. Busy consumers who want a time-convenient product may pay a higher price for that product, so a firm may make the more convenient product more expensive.

=== Bait and switch demarketing ===
The bait-and-switch demarketing strategy is when a firm advertises one product in such a way that the intention is not that the consumers buy that product, but that they buy a more profitable product in its place. Gerstner and Hess (1990) and Chu, Gerstner and Hess (1992) studied disparagement of products in sales presentations or in point of-purchase displays that are designed to discourage consumers from buying featured brands. These practices, however, might be illegal.

=== Stock outage demarketing ===
Another known demarketing strategy is stock outage demarketing, where a firm actually plans a stock outage. Stock outages frustrate consumers, but stores often offer rain checks that guarantee delivery at a future date. Nevertheless, Hess and Gerstner (1987) showed that stores might profit from planned stock outages with rain checks because customers may visit the stores twice and buy complementary products on each visit. Balachander and Farquhar (1991) showed that deliberate stock outages help stores charge higher prices and earn higher profits. The possibility of a stock outage in one store makes customers more eager to buy when the other store has the product in stock.

=== Crowding costs demarketing ===
Crowding cost demarketing is a strategy implemented on “Black Friday” when crowds will deter many consumers from purchasing a product at a lower price. Retail stores, hotels, and airlines have limited capacities. A low price usually attracts large numbers of shoppers, so customers must hunt for space in crowded parking lots and stand in long checkout lines. Businesses may deliberately accept capacity constraints, recognizing that some customers would trade the higher prices for reduced crowding. Gerstner (1986) derived symmetric equilibrium prices and crowding costs in such markets.

=== Differentiation demarketing ===
On the other hand, there has been growing scholarly interest in issues that can be construed as demarketing. There are numerous specific strategies for demarketing that would fall within the 4 P's definitions, although the demarketing terminology is not used. Eitan Gerstner, James Hess and Wujin Chu discuss a few of them in their 1993 article, “Demarketing as a Differentiation Strategy”. The differentiation strategy means that a firm might use a “nuisance factor” that actually drives consumers away from them, and into the arms of their competitors in order to keep their prices elevated. This can also be used to avoid a price war with that competitor.

== Examples ==
=== Healthcare ===
An example of demarketing in action is the demarketing of healthcare consumption that occurred in Canada in the 1990s. Canada's social healthcare system was under stress from overuse or inefficient use. In order to combat these issues, Dr. Gurprit Kindra, from the University of Ottawa made strategic suggestions in an article he wrote in 1995. Kindra suggested that some co-payments and user fees be applied to discourage consumption. He also proposed that a system geared toward more managed care would reduce the number of services being accessed if patients were required to get a referral from a primary point of contact before seeing other specialties. Among his other suggestions were health promotion and education for the general public that would encourage less utilization of the healthcare services and reducing the convenience to patients by restricting access to free or deeply discounted services like Canada's publicly subsidized urgent care facilities and instead make available privatized fast-lane services for those consumers who are willing to pay more.

=== Paper reduction ===
Promoting the use of paperless products at home and in the office to save the trees, is an example of demarketing paper products. Pennsylvania, Texas, Wisconsin, and other states are now issuing electronic vehicle titles.

=== Water conservation ===
Due to the severe drought, the State of California has been restricting water usage, while providing tax rebates for installing synthetic turf. An average home that converts to artificial grass saves about 22,000 gallons of water per year.

=== Carbon footprint ===
Imposing tight regulations on coal by the Environmental Protection Agency and promoting the use of natural gas at power plants to reduce carbon emissions will accelerate the decline of coal for electricity generation.

=== Junk food ===
Promoting high fiber, organic, and healthy products against food and beverages with saturated fat, high fructose corn syrup, and artificial ingredients helps to prevent obesity, diabetes, and other diseases.

=== Cigarettes as a “vice” product ===
While demarketing may be employed to decrease demand, countermarketing seeks to destroy demand. Strategies include promoting anti-smoking/health themes, taxes on tobacco products, imposing mandatory warning labels, decreasing advertising spaces, increasing pricing, and restricting the consumption space in favor of nicotine patches, Nicorette gum, and Nicorette lozenges.

== Unintended outcomes ==
Research points to behavioral reactions to anti-drug ads that go in the opposite direction from that which was intended. In other words, a boomerang effect occurs where greater levels of exposure to anti-drug campaign results in potentially increased use of drugs. The thinking is that anti-drug publicity may convey the idea that "everyone’s doing it."

In addition, it is possible that the ads had an unintended positive impact on perceptions towards drugs by portraying "benefits" associated with using, an association possibly strengthened by repeated exposure to messages and images suggesting the "good-times" people have while on drugs. Beliefs and behaviors of youths were also affected by perceptions regarding older peers.

Further, ABC News reported findings in 2008 that the federal government's effort to keep youngsters from using drugs "is unlikely to have had favorable effects on youths." State government efforts have also come under criticism. A December, 2008, article in Science Daily about an effort by the state of Montana states: "An independent review investigating the effectiveness of a publicly funded graphic anti-methamphetamine advertising campaign has found that the campaign has been associated with many negative outcomes."
