= Liya (musician) =

Nigerian singer and songwriter

- Born: Abdulsalam Suliyat Modasola; 1999 (age 26–27)
- Origin: Nigerian
- Genres: Afro-Fusion
- Occupations: Singer; Songwriter
- Instrument: Vocals
- Years active: 2020–present

Abdulsalam Suliyat Modasola well known as Liya, is a Nigerian singer, and songwriter. She came into the music scene with the release of her first single under Davido Music Worldwide, titled "Melo", shortly after signing a record deal with the label in 2020. The accompanying music video for "Melo", was released on 8 December 2020, starring Davido, and directed by Dammy Twitch for DMW. She was formerly signed to Davido Music Worldwide from 2020 to early 2023. She began releasing songs independently in 2023.

== Early life ==
Abdulsalam Suliyat Modasola was born in Lagos around Ketu in 1999 and raised between Ketu and Alapere, then relocated with her parents to Ikorodu in 2011, where she attended Arabic school for her secondary education. This was before gaining admission into the University of Ilorin in 2014, to study Yoruba Language, and bagging a Bachelor of Arts degree in Linguistics. Speaking with Wale Oloworekende, she said "I go to church with my parents sometimes because they had a lot of Christian friends. There was a Cherubim and Seraphim church behind my house, so I grew up around a lot of music. There were music classes at the Arabic school too. Subconsciously, I picked a lot of melodies from there."

== Career ==
In 2020, she was introduced to the public through Davido's tweet, 5 hours after their meeting in a club through Peruzzi. On 14 September 2021, in an interview with OkayAfrica, Liya said "I played Davido a couple of my songs, including "Melo" and he was hooked, then he asked me and my manager (Hamiid Wonda) to travel with him the next day to Abuja. During our trip, he started saying "first lady way", then took it to twitter." On 2 October 2020, Davido officially signed Liya, as the first female artist under his imprint Davido Music Worldwide. On 27 December 2020, Liya was cited as one of the 10 Nigerian Artistes To Watch by Guardian Life Magazine in 2021, curated by Chisom Njoku, and Asa Asika for Guardian Life Magazine.

On 28 July 2021, she announced her first extended play Alari, to be released officially on 20 August 2021, through DMW. On 21 August 2021, music critic Motolani Alake said "her debut track titled "Melo," the mercurial singer flipped a sample of Angélique Kidjo's "Agolo" into a pop ditty pulsating with regal grace.” during his first impression on the extended play, and called the project an "impressive debut EP". On 24 May 2022, she was nominated for The Headies in the Best Vocal Performance category for females, for the song "Alari". On 25 August 2021, she released the music video for "Adua", directed by Dammy Twitch, and went on to release "Adua (Remix)" with a guest appearance from Simi in 2022.

== Artistry ==
Liya described her music genre as Afro-Fusion, and tells OkayAfrica It consists of a variety of influences that just comes out beautifully", she said. She also revealed her stage name Liya, which was picked out of her middle name Suliyat. Liya cited Angélique Kidjo, Aṣa, and Shola Allyson, as her musical influence or inspiration while growing up.

== Discography ==
Studio album and EP

- Alari - EP (2021)

=== Singles ===
List of singles, showing title and year released with selected chart positions
Title	Year	Chart positions			Certifications	Album
Title	Year	NG	UK	US	Certifications	Album
"Trust Issue"	2020	—	—	—		Non-album single
"Be My Vibe"	2020	—	—	—		Non-album single
"Melo"	2020	—	—	—		Alari
"Adua (Remix)" (featuring. Simi)	2022	—	—	—		Non-album single
"Izz Going (Skalala)"	2022	—	—	—		TBA

=== Guest appearances ===
List of non-single guest appearances, with other performing artists, showing year released and album name
Title	Year	Other artist(s)	Album
"Fiki"	2021	Ejoya	Class of '21
"Adua (Remix)	2022	Simi	To Be Honest Tour

== Accolades ==
Year	Organization	Prize	Recipient	Result	Ref
2022	The Headies	Best Vocal Performance (Female)	Liya for "Alari"	Nominated	
2025	The Headies	Best Vocal Performance (Female)	Liya – "I'm Done"	Won	
