= Kemiyondo Coutinho =

Ugandan playwright, actress, and filmmaker based in Los Angeles, California

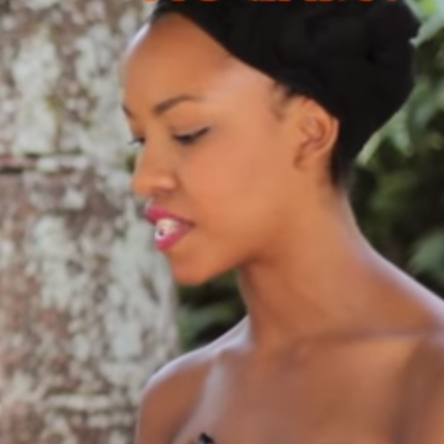
- Born: Kampala

Kemiyondo Coutinho is a Ugandan playwright, actress and filmmaker based in Los Angeles. She started a music platform titled A Ka Dope aimed at giving new Uganda artists an audience. Her directorial debut short film Kyenvu won Best Narrative Short Film at Pan African Film Festival. She was featured on CNN's African Voices for her influential work in the arts.

== Life ==
Coutinho was born in Kampala in Uganda to Ugandan parents Sheila Coutinho and Alex Coutinho. At the age of three weeks she moved to Swaziland (since 2018 renamed to Eswatini) where she was initially educated. At thirteen she joined the United World College of Waterford Kamhlaba in 2001. She graduated in 2007 and went to Portland, Oregon to attend Lewis & Clark College to graduate with a double major in Theater and Communications.

She got her Masters in Fine Arts at The American Conservatory Theater (A.C.T).

In 2007 she wrote and acted in Jabulile! which was performed at the National Arts Festival in Grahamstown. This play was later produced in Canada and in New York and Chicago. The play addressed the lack of opportunity open to Swazi women traders. Her second play, Kawuna…you’re it, also addressed this inequality in particular with regard to HIV/AIDS in 2012.

In 2014 the weekly "Discover Uganda" TV Show was launched by the minister Honorable Maria Mutagamba and the Pearl Guide for NTV Uganda. Coutinho has hosted a series of the travel show.

In July 2015 she appeared "wonderfully" as Lady Torrance in Orpheus Descending by Tennessee Williams in Seattle.

Coutinho is a theatre enthusiast and the founder and artistic director of the NUVO festival that addresses both social and artistic issues in Uganda. NUVO stands for New Voices and it is intended to draw attention to the issue of HIV/Aids.

Kemiyondo wrote, directed and starred in Kyenvu a film about miniskirt harassment in Uganda. She also started A Ka Dope, a musical platform geared at giving new faces in the music industry a stage. She was featured on CNN's African Voices in 2017 for her work in the arts.

== Works include ==
- Jabulile!
- Kawuna…you’re it
- A Girl Like Me
- Kyenvu
- GREEN
- Little America
- P-Valley
- Step Up: High Water
- Survival of the Thickest
