= Ric Hassani =

Nigerian singer

- Also known as: Rico Slim
- Born: Ikechukwu Eric Ahiauzu; 6 January 1989 (age 37); Port Harcourt, Rivers State, Nigeria
- Genres: Soul, Reggae, Pop
- Occupations: Singer; songwriter
- Website: richassani.com

Ikechukwu Eric Ahiauzu (born 6 January 1989) better known as Ric Hassani, is a Nigerian singer, songwriter and musician born in Port Harcourt.

== Education ==
Hassani graduated from Covenant University in Nigeria. He attended the University of Surrey, where he earned a Master's degree in Energy Economics.

== Career ==
Hassani released his debut album The African Gentleman in 2016. He is said to have a dress style that is influenced by his self-acclaimed stance as a gentleman. In April 2023, he released on the same day, his first set of official singles of the year, "Amina" and "The One".

In April, 2024 Ric Hassani was announced as one of the judges for Nigerian Idol S9 alongside Omawumi and 9ice.

== Awards and nominations ==
Hassani was nominated in three categories at the 2016 All Africa Music Awards: Best Artiste in African R&B and Soul, Video of the Year, and Most Promising Artiste. He also received two nominations at The Headies 2016, including Best Alternative Song for "Gentleman".

In December 2018, the Falz and Olamide-assisted "Believe" won Best Collaboration at the Galaxy Music Awards.

== Discography ==
=== Studio albums ===
- The African Gentleman (2016)
- The Prince I Became (2021)
- Afro Love (2023)
- Hassani Workout (2024)
- Lagos Lover Boy (2025)
