= Jáde Osiberu =

Nigerian movie writer and director

Jádesola Osiberu
- Born: 18 August 1985 (age 40); Ibadan
- Citizenship: Nigeria
- Education: Computer Systems Engineering, University of Manchester
- Alma mater: University of Manchester; Pan-Atlantic University
- Occupations: writer, director and producer
- Notable work: Sugar Rush
- Awards: 2018 Africa Magic Viewers' Choice Awards, Best Director
- Website: www.greoh.com

Jádesola Osiberu is a Nigerian writer, director and producer and founder of Greoh Studios. She is known for Isoken (2017), Sugar Rush (2019), Brotherhood (2022) and Gangs of Lagos, the first Nigerian original film set to stream exclusively on Amazon Prime Video. In September 2022, Osiberu's Greoh Studios signed a three-year deal with Amazon to develop and produce original scripted TV series and feature films.

== Early life and education ==
Born to a royal family in 1985, Osiberu's father, Oba Adewale Osiberu is the Elepe of Epe Sagamu. Osiberu had her secondary education in Ibadan, before obtaining a Computer Systems Engineering degree from University of Manchester. She is also an alumna of Pan-Atlantic University, where she studied Media and Communications.

== Career ==
Despite working professionally as a software developer after graduation, Osiberu decided to change career to film-making. In celebration of the Women's History Month, Pulse included her in its list of ten women making waves by developing content in Nigerian film industry. Osiberu started her production company; Tribe85 Productions in 2017 with the aim of "telling African stories to a global audience". During an interview with BellaNaija; her work ethic, attention to detail and creative drive was praised by the interviewer.

In 2018, she headlined Nollywood Film Festival in Scotland.

In 2017, Osiberu wrote and directed Isoken, a film about the challenges faced by an unmarried female professionals amidst pressure from family, as well as romantic interracial relationships in modern Nigerian setting. For her directorial role, she won best director at 2018 Africa Magic Viewers Choice Awards and got a Africa Movie Academy Award for Best Director nomination.

The film was also the subject of scholarly discussions with the titular character being characterized with traits of feminism. Culture Custodian highlighted how the theme of the film is set up to fight misogyny in the Nigerian patriarchal society. Her latest movie Christmas in Lagos, is set to debut on Prime Video on 20 December 2024.

== Filmography ==
Year	Title	Major Cast	Role	Notes	Ref
2013–14	Gidi Up	OC Ukeje, Deyemi Okanlawon, Somkele Iyamah	Producer Writer	Webseries by Ndani TV	
2016	Rumor Has It		Producer	Webseries by Ndani TV	
2017	Isoken	Dakore Akande, Funke Akindele, Joseph Benjamin	Director Writer	Directorial debut	
2018	Nigerian Trade	Rita Dominic, Gideon Okeke and Blossom Chukwujekwu	Producer Writer		
2019	Sugar Rush (film)	Adesua Etomi, Bisola Aiyeola and Bimbo Ademoye	Producer Writer		
2021	Ayinla	Lateef Adedimeji, Omowumi Dada, Bimbo Manuel	Producer		
2021	Gangs of Lagos (2023)	Adesua Etomi-Wellington, Tobi Bakre and Chike	Director Writer	Inspired by events while filming Gidi Up	
2022	Brotherhood	Tobi Bakre, Folarin Falana, Toni Tones, Ronke Ojo, Bright Okpocha, OC Ukeje,	Producer		
2024	Christmas in Lagos	Richard Mofe-Damijo, Shaffy Bello, Wale Ojo, Teniola Aladese, Angel Anosike, Shalom C Obiago, and Rayxia Ojo	Director Writer		

== Awards and nominations ==
Year	Award	Category	Work	Result	Ref
2015	Africa Magic Viewers' Choice Awards	Best Television Series Comedy/Drama	Gidi Up	Nominated	
2015	Africa Magic Viewers' Choice Awards	Best Sound Editor	Gidi Up	Nominated	
2018	Africa Magic Viewers' Choice Awards	Best Director	Isoken	Won	
2018	Africa Magic Viewers' Choice Awards	Best Costume Designer	Isoken	Nominated	
2018	Africa Magic Viewers' Choice Awards	Best Art Director	Isoken	Nominated	
2018	Africa Movie Academy Awards	Best Director	Isoken	Nominated	
2023	Africa Magic Viewers' Choice Awards	Best Writer	The Trade	Nominated	
2023	Africa Magic Viewers' Choice Awards	Best Director	The Trade	Nominated	
2023	Africa Magic Viewers' Choice Awards	Best Movie West Africa	Brotherhood	Won	
2023	Africa Magic Viewers' Choice Awards	Best Overall Movie	Brotherhood	Nominated	

== Personal life ==
Osiberu had her marriage ceremony on 11 May 2019 in Sagamu, Ogun State.

== See also ==
- List of Nigerian film producers
- List of Nigerian film directors
- Shiloh Godson
