= Brotherhood (2022 film) =

- Directed by: Loukman Ali
- Written by: Jade Osiberu; Abdul Tijani-Ahmed
- Produced by: Jade Osiberu
- Starring: Falz; Tobi Bakre; Ronke Oshodi Oke; Boma Akpore; Sam Dede; Toni Tones; Basket Mouth
- Music by: Tolu Obanro
- Production company: Greoh Studios
- Distributed by: Genesis Pictures
- Release date: 23 September 2022
- Country: Nigeria
- Language: English
- Box office: ₦328,881,120

Brotherhood is a 2022 Nigerian crime action thriller film produced by Jade Osiberu. It stars Tobi Bakre, Falz, Basketmouth, Sam Dede, Ronke Oshodi Oke, Toni Tones, Zubby Michael, and Mr Macaroni. The film had a pan-African release on 23 September 2022 in a dozen countries that included Nigeria, Cameroon, Benin Republic, Burkina Faso, Togo, Niger Republic, Senegal, Congo, Rwanda, Gabon, Guinea, and Madagascar. As of December 2024, Brotherhood is the eighth highest grossing Nigerian film in Nigerian cinemas.

== Synopsis ==
Brotherhood tells the story of twin brothers Wale Adetula and Akin Adetula, who witnessed their parents' murder as young boys. Now adults, they find themselves on opposite sides of the law; Wale is part of a police SWAT team while Akin has a criminal record. After Akin is released from his most recent prison stay, he joins the notorious 'Ojuju Boys' to help them rob bullion vans and banks. Their first operation is successful, motivating the gang to move on to a bigger heist, which Akin initially resists, but ultimately joins. Wale's SWAT team is deployed and blocks their escape, killing most of the Ojuju Boys. One of them, Izra, betrays his fellow gang members and escapes with the stolen money. Akin's lover and only female member of the gang, Goldie, gets killed in their attempt to escape. Akin is confronted by Wale, who urges him to surrender and be arrested. Akin is shot by the police and falls from the bridge into the Lagoon. Divers are deployed to retrieve his body, but it is not found. Wale is taken into custody by Internal Affairs, investigating whether he is colluding with his brother and the Ojuju Boys. Izra connects with a smuggler in an attempt to escape the country with the stolen loot, claiming he is the only survivor of the heist. Akin finds and kills Izra before he is able to leave the country. The film ends with Akin calling Wale, who has been cleared by Internal Affairs, from an unknown number from Togo.

== Cast ==
- Tobi Bakre as Akin Adetula
- Falz as Wale Adetula
- Basketmouth as Shadow
- Mr Macaroni as Adura
- Sam Dede as Officer Daniel
- Toni Tones as Goldie
- Oc Ukeje as Izra
- Ronke Oshodi Oke as Aunty Morenike
- Dorathy Bachor as Kamsi
- Boma Akpore as Sanusi
- Seyi Awolowo as Kehinde
- Omawunmi as Officer Monsurat
- Diane Russet as Efe
- Zubby Micheal as Poison
- Swanky JKA as Simon

== Production and release ==
Brotherhood was shot in Lagos, Nigeria, and was co-written by Jade Osiberu and Abdul Tijani-Ahmed. It was directed by Ugandan director, Loukman Ali. Following its release, Adebola Williams, chairman of AW Network and an executive producer of the film, stated that "Brotherhood will usher in a new era of fearless filmmaking in the African film industry". He also went further to state that AW Network has partnered with Jade Osiberu to push the frontiers of storytelling. Brotherhood premiered on 16 September 2022 in Lagos at Jewel Aeida. The premiere was sponsored by Fearless drink brand. The theme of the premiere was 'Ojuju' as invitees all dressed in accordance with the theme. Riquesa Africa sponsored a ₦2 million prize for the best-dressed celebrities at the premiere. Several celebrities and personalities attended the premiere, including Mercy Aigbe, Bisola Aiyeola, Dorathy Bachor, Ifu Ennada, Prince Nelson, Alex Unusual, Pretty Mike, Elozonam, Priscilla Ajoke Ojo, and Enioluwa Adeoluwa.

== Awards and nominations ==
Year	Award	Category	Recipient	Result	Ref
2023	Africa Magic Viewers' Choice Awards	Best Supporting Actress	Toni Tones	Nominated	
2023	Africa Magic Viewers' Choice Awards	Best Supporting Actor	OC Ukeje	Nominated	
2023	Africa Magic Viewers' Choice Awards	Best Actor In A Drama, Movie Or TV Series	Tobi Bakre	Won	
2023	Africa Magic Viewers' Choice Awards	Best Art Director	Olugbenga Ogunshina and Joy Kadiri	Nominated	
2023	Africa Magic Viewers' Choice Awards	Best Costume Designer	Ezugworie Franca	Nominated	
2023	Africa Magic Viewers' Choice Awards	Best Lighting Designer	Mathew Yusuf	Won	
2023	Africa Magic Viewers' Choice Awards	Best Picture Editor	Martini Akande	Nominated	
2023	Africa Magic Viewers' Choice Awards	Best Cinematographer	Loukman Ali	Won	
2023	Africa Magic Viewers' Choice Awards	Best Director	Loukman Ali	Won	
2023	Africa Magic Viewers' Choice Awards	Best Movie, West Africa	Jade Osiberu	Won	
2023	Africa Magic Viewers' Choice Awards	Best Overall Movie	Jade Osiberu	Nominated	
