= The Blind Date (film) =

Ugandan short film

- Official Poster
- Directed by: Loukman Ali
- Screenplay by: Loukman Ali
- Produced by: Usama Mukwaya
- Starring: Martha Kay; Raymond Rushabiro; Michael Wawuyo Jr.
- Cinematography: Loukman Ali
- Production companies: Loukout Films, Net Studios Africa
- Release date: 12 February 2021 (Uganda)
- Running time: 29 minutes
- Country: Uganda
- Language: English

The Blind Date is a 2021 Ugandan film written and directed by Loukman Ali starring Martha Kay, Michael Wawuyo Jr. and Raymond Rushabiro. The short film marks the second collaboration between Usama Mukwaya and Loukman Ali after Kyaddala TV Series which was released in 2019. The Blind Date is the first of the numerous episodes meant to make an anthology, with the follow-up episode already in the making. The film won Best short film at the 8th Uganda Film Festival awards. It had its African premiere at the 24th Zanzibar International Film Festival.

== Plot ==
Jeff (Michael Wawuyo Jr.) has a crush on a girl (Martha Kay) that's way outside his social class but he won't let that stop him. He'll do whatever it takes, including breaking a few rules.

== Cast ==
- Martha Kay as Emily
- Michael Wawuyo Jr. as Jeff
- Raymond Rushabiro as Jacob
- Patriq Nkakalukanyi as Martin
- River Dan Rugaju as Nathan
- Allen Musumba as Jacobs Wife

== Awards ==
=== Won ===
- 2021: Best Short Film, Uganda Film Festival

=== Nominated ===
- 2021: Best Short Film, 42 Durban International Film Festival
