= Loukman Ali =

Ugandan film director (born 1990)

- Born: 1 June 1990 (age 35); Kampala, Uganda
- Occupations: Cinematographer; film director; screenwriter; graphic designer
- Years active: 2014–present
- Awards: 2021: Best Short Film, Uganda Film Festival

Loukman Ali (born 1 June 1990) is a Ugandan director, cinematographer, screenwriter, producer and graphic designer.

== Early life and career ==
Loukman Ali was born in Kampala in the neighborhood of Kibuli. His father's origins are from the Comoros. Afflicted with dyslexia, he struggled in school from a young age, but excelled at drawing. In his early teenage years, Ali built on those skills, learning photoshop and 3D animation, and then camera in hand, learned to shoot and edit. At 16 he won a competition and was creating cartoons at the Ugandan English daily New Vision.

Following secondary school, Ali attended Makare University for a short while before dropping out to pursue a full-time career. He worked for a recording studio and various creative agencies in a series of roles that included video producer, motion graphics artist, and creative art director. In an interview he explained how his early career informed his filmmaking: “The commercials helped me gain the confidence I needed...Graphic design taught me how to tell stories using a single frame, which has helped a lot in my cinematography. Also, I design my own posters which is from my graphic design days.”

== Filmmaking Career ==
While living in Norway in the early 2010s, Ali shot his first film, Monday (2013) a six-minute short featuring his then girlfriend. His next film, The Bad Mexican, a short comedy released in 2017 was filmed in Uganda. The film was screened in various festivals including the Zanzibar International Film Festival (ZIFF) and Amakula International Film Festival.

His breakout came in 2021 with the release of his first feature, the crime thrillerThe Girl in the Yellow Jumper. Though the film was completed in 2020, the film's release was delayed due to the COVID-19 pandemic. After premiering at New York's UrbanWorld Film Festival and screening in festivals throughout 2021, it dropped on Netflix in December of that year, the first Ugandan film to be released by the streamer. The film won Best African film at the 2022 Africa Magic Viewers Choice Awards (AMVCA) and Best Director at the 2021 Realtime International Film Festival.

2021 also saw Ali release two shorts that he wrote and directed and were intended as part of an anthology: The Blind Date and Sixteen Rounds, both starring Michael Wawuyo Jr, in their follow on collaboration to Wawuyo's lead role in The Girl in the Yellow Jumper. Both films were co-produced with Usama Mukwaya. Sixteen Rounds went on to win Best African Short Film at the Durban Film Festival in 2022.

In 2022 Ali was brought on board by Nollywood producer Jade Osiberu as director and cinematographer for the Nigerian crime thriller Brotherhood. At the 2023 Africa Magic Viewers' Choice Awards the film won Best West African film and garnered Ali the Best Director and Best Cinematographer awards.

In 2023, Ali released Ubuntu Uppercut, a short martial arts film starring Michael Wawuyo Jr, Lucy ‘Smize’ Bunyenyezi, and Kiman Lee. That same year, he also wrote and directed Katera of the Punishment Island, part of the Netflix/Unesco anthology African Folktales Reimagined. The story was based on a practice that existed until the mid-20th century in which Ugandan girls who became pregnant out of wedlock were banished and left to die on the Island of Akampene, also known as Punishment Island.

In June 2024, it was announced that Ali had secured a deal with French production companies Black Mic Mac and Logical Pictures to fund his next project.

Ali has pointed to his love of action movies dating to his childhood as inspiration for his filmmaking, as well as directors such as Quentin Tarantino, James Cameron, Steven Spielberg and Edgar Wright.

== Filmography ==
=== Film ===
Year	Title	Credited as			Notes
Year	Title	Director	Producer	Writer	Notes
2013	Monday	Yes	Yes	No	
2017	The Bad Mexican	Yes	Yes	Yes	
2020	The Girl in the Yellow Jumper	Yes	Yes	Yes	First Ugandan Netflix Film
2021	The Blind Date	Yes	Yes	Yes	
2021	Sixteen Rounds	Yes	Yes	Yes	
2022	Brotherhood	Yes	No	No	
TBA	Captain Ddamba	Yes	No	Yes	Cancelled sixteen rounds sequel
2023	Ubuntu Uppercut	Yes	Yes	Yes	
2023	Katera of the Punishment Island	Yes	Yes	Yes	Released on Netflix

== Awards and nominations ==
=== Won ===
- 2021: Best Short Film, Uganda Film Festival
- 2023: Best Director, Brotherhood
- 2023: Best Cinematographer

=== Nominated ===
- 2021: Best Short Film, 42 Durban International Film Festival
