= Chike (singer) =

Nigerian singer (born 1993)

- Born: Chike Ezekpeazu Osebuka; 28 January 1993 (age 33); Onitsha, Anambra State, Nigeria
- Genres: Afrobeats; R&B; Afropop; highlife; soul
- Occupations: Singer; songwriter; Actor
- Years active: 2016–present

Chike Ezekpeazu Osebuka (born January 28, 1993) best known by his stage name Chike, is a Nigerian singer, songwriter and actor. He participated in the Nigerian reality competition Project Fame West Africa and finishing in second place on the Season 1 of The Voice Nigeria. He made his acting debut as Mayoma Badmus on the Africa Magic Showcase telenovela Battleground and appeared in Gang of Lagos as Ify.

Chike released his debut studio album, Boo of the Booless, on 14 February 2020. His second studio album, The Brother's Keeper, was released in 2022. His music has been nominated for several awards including the Headies and the Nigerian Entertainment Awards.

== Early life and education ==
Chike is a native of Onitsha, Anambra State in the south-eastern region of Nigeria and is one of four children. Chike's decision to pursue a career in music was influenced by his family. He is a graduate of Covenant University with a bachelor's degree in Computer Engineering.

== Career ==
=== Project Fame and The Voice Nigeria ===
Chike was featured as a contestant on Project Fame West Africa. However, he was eliminated after reaching the Top 10.

Chike auditioned for The Voice Nigeria with a cover of James Arthur's "Roses" and he opted to join Team Patoranking. In the battle round, he performed Mario's "Let Me Love You" with another Team Patoranking contestant and was chosen to move to the next round. In the first week of live shows, he performed "Not the Girl" by co-coach Dare Art Alade and earned a 'save' from his coach. In the second week of live shows, he performed The Weeknd's "Earned It" and was saved by public votes. He also performed a rendition of "I'm Gonna Be (500 Miles)" by The Proclaimers and earned his coach's final save of the season. For the semi-finals, he performed "Pullover" by Kcee and Wizkid. In the finale, Chike performed covers of Bob Marley and the Wailers's "No Woman No Cry" and Kiss Daniel's "Mama". He finished as the runner-up of The Voice Nigeria' season, with A'rese from Team Waje coming in first place.

==== 2016–2024 ====
After The Voice Nigeria, Chike was signed to Universal Republic along with the other top four contestants on the show. He released his debut single Fancy U in December 2016 under Universal Republic, with its music video being released in early 2017. Chike was also made an ambassador for Airtel Nigeria along with the other seven finalists of The Voice Nigeria.

In April 2017, Chike had been cast by Africa Magic to play the role of Mayowa Badmus in a television drama named Battleground. Chike departed from Universal Republic in November 2017 to become an independent artist. He released his next single, titled "Beautiful People," in February 2018. Chike released his 14-track debut studio album, Boo of the Booless, during a performance at the 2020 Big Brother Lockdown TV show. In September 2023, Chike was announced as a brand ambassador for Glo telecommunication alongside Asake, Kizz Daniel.

Chike announced that his third studio album, Son of Chike, would be released on July 19, 2024. The album includes collaborations with Nigerian artists like Olamide, Ladipoe, and Qing Madi.

In 2024, Chike earns his biggest streaming day on Spotify Nigeria, following the release of "Funds".

== Personal life ==
In May 2026, Chike became the subject of media attention after television host Frank Edoho claimed that his estranged wife Sandra Onyenucheya had been having an affair with the singer, and that it contributed to the breakdown of the marriage. Onyenucheya denied the accusation.

== Discography ==
=== Albums ===
- Boo of the Booless
- The Brother's Keeper
- Son of Chike

=== Soundtracks ===
- "On Fire (Pana Time)" for Gangs of Lagos

== Filmography ==
- Gangs of Lagos (2023) as Ify
- Knee Down (2022) as Chima
- Life as It Is (2019 TV Mini Series) as Junior
- AMCOP: Clandestine (2019) as George
- Battle Ground: Africa Magic (2017 TV Series) as Mayowa Bhadmus

== Awards and nominations ==
Year	Award	Category	Recipient	Result	Ref
2020	City People Music Awards	Album of the Year	"Boo of the Booless"	Won	
2020	The Headies 2020	Best Vocal Performance (Male)	"Chike – "Forgive"	Nominated	
2020	The Headies 2020	Best R&B Album	Boo of the Booless – Chike	Nominated	
2020	The Headies 2020	Album of the Year	Boo of the Booless – Chike	Nominated	
2021	Net Honours	Most Played RnB Song	"Running to You" (featuring Simi)	Nominated	
2022	The Headies 2022	Best R&B Single	"Running (To You)" – Chike feat. Simi	Nominated	
2022	The Headies 2022	Best Music Video	"Roju" – (Chike) – Directed by Pink	Nominated	
2022	The Headies 2022	Best Collaboration	"Running (To You)" – Chike feat. Simi	Nominated	
2022	The Headies 2022	Best Rap Single	"Breathe" – A-Q feat Chike	Nominated	
2023	The Headies 2023	Best R&B Single	"Hard to Find" – Chike	Nominated	
2023	The Headies 2023	Best Vocal Performance (Male)	"Spell (remix)" – Chike	Nominated	
2023	The Headies 2023	Best Music Video	"Spell" – (Chike) – Directed by Pink	Won	
2023	The Headies 2023	Best R&B Album	"The Brother’s Keeper" – Chike	Won	
2024	TurnTable Music Awards	No. 1 Music Video	"Egwu"	Won	
2025	The Headies 2024	Best Collaboration	"Egwu" – Chike & MohBad	Nominated	
2025	The Headies 2024	Afrobeats Single Of The Year	"Egwu" – Chike & MohBad	Nominated	
2025	The Headies 2024	Headies’ Viewers’ Choice	"Egwu" – Chike & MohBad	Won	
2025	The Headies 2024	Song Of The Year	"Egwu" – Chike & MohBad	Nominated	
2025	The Headies 2024	Best Music Video	"Egwu" – Chike & MohBad – Directed by Pink	Won	
2025	Trace Awards & Festival	Best Artist (Western Africa Anglophone)	Chike	Nominated	
