= Queen of Katwe (Original Motion Picture Soundtrack) =

Soundtrack album by Various artists
- Released: September 23, 2016
- Recorded: 2015–2016
- Length: 1:02:55 (standard); 1:40:17 (deluxe)
- Label: Walt Disney
- Producers: Various: A Pass; Afrigo Band; Paul Butler; Young Cardamom; Peter Cobbin; Alex Heffes; Tony Houls; Illangelo; Izaya; Eddy Kenzo; Alicia Keys; Kuseim; P-Funk Majani; Paddyman; Mira Nair; Nessim; David Washington; Kirsty Whalley; Bobi Wine

Singles from Queen of Katwe (Original Motion Picture Soundtrack)
- 1. "Back to Life" Released: September 9, 2016

Queen of Katwe (Original Motion Picture Soundtrack) is the soundtrack to the 2016 American film Queen of Katwe directed by Mira Nair. It was released by Walt Disney Records on September 23, 2016. The film, produced by Walt Disney Pictures and ESPN Films, stars David Oyelowo, Lupita Nyong'o, and Madina Nalwanga, and depicts the life of Phiona Mutesi, a girl living in Katwe, Uganda, who learns to play chess and becomes a Woman Candidate Master after her victories at World Chess Olympiads. The film is based on inscripts from the ESPN magazine article and a book written by Tim Crothers, based on her life.

The film's score is composed by British musician Alex Heffes. The soundtrack consists of African pop and Afrobeat music, performed by rap artists originating from Africa and America, including Grammy Award-winning Alicia Keys, MC Galaxy, A Pass, Eddy Kenzo, Jose Chameleone, Afrigo Band, Moses Matovu and several artists. The score consisted of popular Ugandan music. Keys' single track "Back to Life" was released for promotional purposes on September 9, prior to the album release. A deluxe edition of the album was also released on the same day, that included Heffes' score along with the songs.

== Development ==
In January 2016, Alex Heffes was announced as the film's music composer. Speaking to Film Music Magazine, Heffes stated that the score is very "thematic, gentle and orchestral" in comparison to his score for miniseries Roots, though the film is set in Africa. He added the storyline is "universal" and "There are plenty of authentic Ugandan needle drop tracks in the film to set the scene so the score could concentrate more on the music story telling".

Nair's son Zohran Mamdani, a.k.a. Young Cardamom, had curated and produced the soundtrack, while also acting as the music supervisor, along with Linda Cohen. He took inspiration from the musical scene in Katwe streets "to immerse the audience in the modern sound of Kampala". Mamdani had also recorded the track "#1 Spice" with HAB. In an interview to Teen Vogue, they stated that the song was curated several months ago, and while working as the music co-ordinator with Cohen, Mamdani had asked to provide an original song which they demanded that the character should sing along to in two scenes. He further exclaimed "The writing part was also interesting because it's about salt farming, which we knew nothing about, but was central to the story of Phiona and the people around her. We researched what that whole experience was like and reading about those messed up realities and how much it can affect your body was intense. We found ways to work that into the narrative so listeners can learn something from it as well. I think overall, the song really captured the ethos of the film: the cycle of struggle, hustle and celebration."

The soundtrack featured several other prominent artists, mostly from African countries, including: Radio and Weasel, MC Galaxy, A Pass, P-Square, Davido, Jose Chameleone, Afrigo Band, Moses Matovu, Eddy Kenzo, Joanita Kawalya amongst several others. "Back to Life" an original song performed by 15-time Grammy Award-winning Alicia Keys was released as a promotional single on September 9, 2016. Explaining that the film's storyline, inspired her to write the song, Keys said that "This song is about how there's no stopping when you're determined and you believe in yourself."

== Track listing ==
Queen of Katwe (Original Motion Picture Soundtrack) – Standard edition
No.	Title	Artist(s)	Length
1.	"#1 Spice"	Young Cardamom & HAB	3:50
2.	"Sekem"	MC Galaxy	3:58
3.	"Budo!"	Alex Heffes	2:05
4.	"Tuli Kubigere"	A Pass	3:17
5.	"Bomboclat"	Jose Chameleone featuring Weasel	3:45
6.	"Brian, My Brother!"	Alex Heffes	1:00
7.	"Skelewu"	Davido	3:09
8.	"Juicy"	Radio and Weasel	3:46
9.	"It Is Fine"	Alex Heffes	1:03
10.	"Engoma Yange"	Nsubuga Saava Karim	4:26
11.	"Wuuyo"	A Pass	4:21
12.	"Oswadde Nnyo"	Afrigo Band and Moses Matovu	3:29
13.	"Mbilo Mbilo"	Eddy Kenzo	3:50
14.	"Escape from Hospital"	Alex Heffes	0:57
15.	"Nfunda N'omubi"	Afrigo Band and Joanita Kawalya	2:48
16.	"Kiwani"	Bobi Wine	4:49
17.	"The Promise of Harriet"	Alex Heffes	1:16
18.	"Kyempulila"	A Pass	2:26
19.	"Home Again"	Michael Kiwanuka	3:31
20.	"Back to Life"	Alicia Keys	4:54
21.	"Shekini"	P-Square	3:38
Total length:			62:55

Queen of Katwe (Original Motion Picture Soundtrack) – Deluxe edition (bonus tracks)
No.	Title	Artist(s)	Length
21.	"Am I Ready?"	Alex Heffes	2:16
22.	"We Have a Champion"	Alex Heffes	1:15
23.	"New World"	Alex Heffes	2:01
24.	"Phiona Wins Joseph"	Alex Heffes	2:46
25.	"At the Threshold"	Alex Heffes	1:28
26.	"Father Grimes – Commence Play!"	Alex Heffes	1:09
27.	"Such Aggressiveness in a Girl Is a Treasure"	Alex Heffes	1:20
28.	"You Make a Plan Mama"	Alex Heffes	2:43
29.	"Is This Heaven?"	Alex Heffes	1:43
30.	"Like Ghosts"	Alex Heffes	1:45
31.	"Olympiad"	Alex Heffes	4:00
32.	"The Water Takes Everything It Wants"	Alex Heffes	3:17
33.	"Robert Katende, I Am Your Mother"	Alex Heffes	1:47
34.	"School"	Alex Heffes	1:37
35.	"Entering Rwabushenyi"	Alex Heffes	1:24
36.	"You Belong Here"	Alex Heffes	4:17
37.	"We Are Home"	Alex Heffes	2:26
Total length:			100:27

== Reception ==
LaughingPlace.com wrote that "The authentic African music makes you feel connected to the film's characters and the city of Katwe" and praised Heffes' score stating "worth a listen isolated from the film and offers a very unique listening experience". Claudia Pigg of TheWrap wrote "The Afrocentric soundtrack and score by Alex Heffes utilizing native Ugandan instruments, is delightfully infectious". Mihr Fadnavis of Firstpost had stated that "Alex Heffes' wonderful soundtrack that features native Ugandan instruments beautifully complements the visuals on the screen, which may leave you with a moist tear duct or two." NewsBytes-based Emma Meconi called the music and dancing was "uplifting" which "revealed the true character of the Ugandans, that of a joyful spirit, resilient nature and happy hearts."

== Release history ==
Date	Format(s)	Label	Ref.
September 23, 2016	Digital download; streaming	Walt Disney Records	
September 30, 2016	CD	Walt Disney Records	

== Personnel ==
Credits adapted from Allmusic

- Soundtrack producer – Mira Nair, Young Cardamom
- Score producer – Alex Heffes
- Music supervisors – Young Cardamom, Linda Cohen
- Music production supervisor – Ryan Hopman
- Music editors – Jim Bruening
- Engineers – Chris Barrett, Peter Cobbin, Carlo "Illangelo" Montagnese, Ann Mincieli
- Music programming – Beth Caucci
- Music mixing – Peter Cobbin, Carlo Montagnese
- Mastering – Patricia Sullivan Fourstar, David Kutch
- Music assistance – Sean Klein, Brendan Morawski, Jon Schater
- Score conductor – Rebecca Dale
- Music preparation – Colin Rae
- Score co-ordinator and contractor – Hilary Skewes
- Score editor – Cécile de Tournesac
- Score mixing – Kirsty Whalley
- Orchestration – Tommy Laurence, John Ashton Thomas
- Orchestra leader – Jonathan Morton
- Executive in-charge of music – Mitchell Leib
- Creative art – Kaylyn Frank
- Technical coordinator – Red Bennett

== Accolades ==
Award	Date of ceremony	Category	Recipient(s)	Result	Ref.
Black Reel Awards	February 16, 2017	Outstanding Original Song	"Back to Life" – Alicia Keys, Illangelo and Billy Walsh	Nominated	
