= Walter Okas =

Ugandan chess player (born 1986)

Personal information
- Born: 1986 (age 39–40)

Chess career
- Country: Uganda
- Title: FIDE Master (2022)
- Peak rating: 2308 (April 2016)

Walter Okas is a Ugandan chess player and FIDE Master who has represented Uganda in international competitions including the Chess Olympiad.

He has also served in administrative and coaching roles within the Uganda Chess Federation. He is the current General Secretary where he was unopposed in the elections that took place in December 2025.

== Political career ==
Okas began playing chess competitively in Uganda as a youth player and went on to win several junior tournaments. He won the NRM National Chess Championship in 2004 at the age of 19, gaining national recognition in Uganda's chess community.

He later earned the title of FIDE Master (FM) after achieving the required international rating threshold. Okas has represented Uganda in international competitions including the Chess Olympiad, participating in events such as the 43rd Chess Olympiad that took place in Batumi, Georgia in 2018; and the 44th Chess Olympiad that took place in Chennai, in 2022.

In addition to tournament play, Okas has served in leadership roles within the Uganda Chess Federation, including positions such as player representative and federation official. He has also contributed to international chess governance through involvement with the FIDE Fair Play Commission.

== Campaign and priorities ==
Beyond competition, Okas has been involved in chess development and training programs in Uganda. He has served as a coach and mentor for youth chess teams and has supported national team preparations for international events.

His work in chess development has included promoting youth participation in chess and preparing Ugandan teams for regional and global competitions.

== See also ==
- Phiona Mutesi
- Peninah Nakabo
- Christine Namaganda
- Gloria Nansubuga
- Haruna Nsubuga
- Wasswa Mark Nyola
- Arthur Ssegwanyi
- Harold Wanyama
