= Robert Katende =

Ugandan chess coach (born 1982)

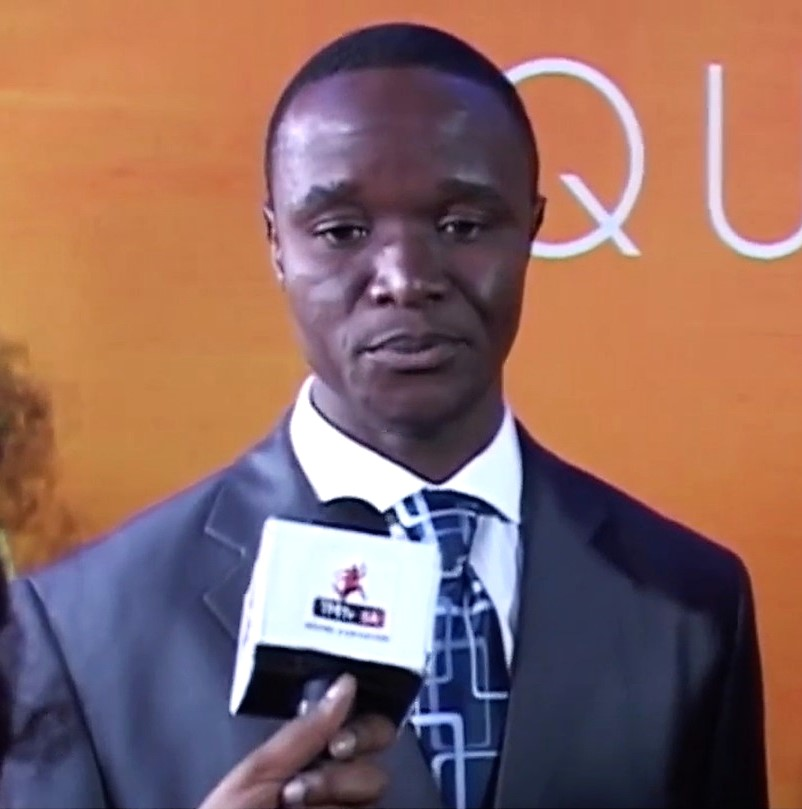
Katende interviewed at the Queen of Katwe premiere in Johannesburg, in 2016

Robert Katende is a Ugandan chess coach, footballer, and engineer. He is also the executive director of Sports Outreach.

He promoted the game of chess to the slums and street kids of Kampala. He is also known for mentoring Phiona Mutesi, Uganda's first woman candidate master chess player and the subject of a 2012 book by Tim Crothers and a 2016 film, Queen of Katwe, directed by Mira Nair and written by William Wheeler. David Oyelowo played the role of Robert Katende in the film, which also features Lupita Nyong'o and Madina Nalwanga.

== Early life and education ==
Katende was born in Kiboga district to a teenage mother and lived with his grandmother in his childhood. He grew up in Naakulabye, a city suburb in Kampala. He started his school life at St Elizabeth primary school then went to Lubiri Secondary School where he was introduced to chess. From Lubiri, he joined Kyambogo University where he pursued a diploma in civil engineering and developed his understanding of chess. He took up soccer and later played professionally for Miracle football club, Top TV FC, and sports outreach ambassadors.

Katende currently holds a degree in information technology and computer engineering as well as a master's degree in international community development from Northwest University in the United States.

He is a certified chess FIDE instructor and arbiter.

== Career ==
While at Kyambogo University, Katende realized he could help young people with their soccer and chess and started volunteering with sports outreach.

In 2003, he started chess outreach in slums. While running these chess programs in Katwe, he requested the Uganda Chess Federation to allow his team of slum kids to compete in the national secondary schools chess tournament. His requests were turned down several times because the kids weren't part of an actual school, but after much insistence, his team was allowed but only as guests in the tournament in 2005. The team performed beyond the expectations of the organizers. His team's performance convinced the Uganda Chess Federation to offer Katende a position as chairman of the chess in schools committee and later as director of development.

While teaching chess to the children in the slums, Katende met and mentored Phiona Mutesi. Mutesi went on to be successful in chess at the world stage and a book and a film were written about her life in the slums and how chess lifted her to the world stage. Katende worked as a consultant on the production team of the film, especially on the chess scenes.

Katende was awarded by the world chess federation for using chess to create social impact in slums. He was also appointed general secretary for the social action commission of the world chess federation.

He is the founder and director of a non profit school; SOM chess academy that has branches in several communities with the aim of uplifting slum children's lives. Katende also launched "The Robert Katende initiative" to inspire, empower and transform the lives of the disadvantaged children. He is also the director of Sports Outreach Uganda.

In 2018, Katende was selected to join the inaugural Obama Foundation leaders Africa program.

== Family ==
Katende is married to Sarah Ntongo. They have three daughters.

== Awards ==
In 2017, to honor Katende's contribution to the chess community, the International Chess Federation (FIDE) awarded him the Tigran Petrosian award.

In 2018, Katende was one of 200 African leaders recognized by the Obama Foundation. His work was also featured in the 2018 Obama Foundation Summit.

== Author ==
In 2019, Katende published A Knight without a Castle describing the difficulties in his childhood and how he decided to use chess as a tool to transform lives.
