= Peninah Nakabo =

Ugandan chess player (born 1992)

Personal information
- Born: September 3, 1992 (age 34) Mukono, Uganda

Chess career
- Country: Uganda
- Title: Woman FIDE Master (2025)
- Peak rating: 1900 (February 2025)

Peninah Nakabo (born 3 September 1992) also known as Penny is a Ugandan chess player. She was the champion of the Africa Amateurs U2000 women’s category. She also won a bronze medal at the World Amateurs U1700 category in April 2018.

== Background and education ==
Nakabo studied from Satellite View Primary School for her primary education. She completed her O-Level studies at St. Michael High School in Sonde and her A-Level education at Kasawo Secondary School. She later attended Makerere University in Kampala, where she earned a Bachelor’s degree in Statistics with honors. It was during her time at Makerere University that she was introduced to chess and began playing in contests.

== Career ==
Nakabo's chess journey began in December 2013 at Makerere University, where she joined fellow students in training sessions at Mary Stuart Hall. In 2014, began her competitive chess career by joining the Mulago Rooks Chess Club and participating in the National Chess League, where she won a silver medal on board 5. In the same year, she represented Makerere University's Ladies Chess Team at the East Africa University Games held at Uganda Christian University, earning a gold medal for the best board one player, and contributing to the team's overall gold medal victory.

In 2015, while still in Mulago Rooks Chess Club, she participated in the National Chess League and achieved a second-place finish on board 5. In 2016, she transitioned to Kireka Chess Club, joining forces with Ampaire Shakira on board 5.In 2017,she competed in the Uganda Open Chess Championship, securing the third position among female participants. In 2018, she represented Uganda at the Africa Amateur Individual Chess Championship in Zambia, where she clinched the title of Africa Amateur Woman Chess Champion 2017 and earned the Woman FIDE Master (WFM) title.

In April, she represented both Africa and Uganda at the World Amateur Chess Championship in Cagliari, Italy, finishing third in the Women's U1700 section and bringing home a bronze medal. In 2023, she was selected to lead Uganda's medal hunt at the 2023 Africa Games, following her previous success at the 2018 Africa Amateurs Chess Championship. Despite a strong effort, Uganda's chess team narrowly missed out on medals at the 2023 African Games. In 2024, she participated in the African Individual Chess Championships at the Coconut Grove Regency Hotel in Accra, Ghana.

== Achievements ==
YEAR	AWARD
2017	Africa Amateur Woman Chess Champion title.
2018	A bronze medal in the Women's U1700 section at the World Amateur Chess Championship in Cagliari, Italy
2022	Triumphed at the Kireka Chess Open
2024	Woman Candidate Master (WCM) title at African Individual Chess Championship

== Personal life ==
Peninah is born to Mr. Sekiziyivu Sammy Jones and Mrs. Nalugo Mary Margaret Sekiziyivu of Mukono. She is married to a fellow chess player Arthur Ssegwanyi with whom they won the 6th Kireka Open at Gloria Gardens in Namugongo. She also serves as the C.E.O of Elite magazine.

== See also ==
- Phiona Mutesi
- Arthur Ssegwanyi
- Goretti Angolikin
- Grace Kigeni
- Christine Namaganda
- Ivy Amoko
- Sana Omprakash Kayyar
