= Grace Kigeni =

Ugandan chess player (born 1988)

Personal information
- Born: 1988 (age 37–38)

Chess career
- Country: Uganda
- Title: Woman FIDE Master (2015)
- Peak rating: 1783 (March 2024)

Grace Kigeni Ateenyi Sengendo (born 1988) is a Ugandan chess player. She holds a title of a Woman FIDE Master. She was Uganda Women's National Chess Champion in 2013. Her national rank in Uganda is 187 (All players) and in Africa (All players) she ranks 6962. She is a member of the Ugandan Chess Federation.

Kigeni was the only Ugandan who defeated English chess grandmaster Nigel Short when he visited Uganda to participate in Anatoly Karpov's FIDE presidency election campaign in 2010. Short played 25 games during that tour. He won 23 games, lost one and drew one game.

== Chess career ==
In 2010, Kigeni was a member of the Mulago kings. Kigeni participated in the 2010 Makerere University Chess Open, where she was won by Ivy Amoko. Kigeni defeated Nigel Short in Uganda as he had come to participate in Anatoly Karpov's FIDE presidency election Africa campaign in 2010. She participated in the 39th World Chess Olympiad that took place in Russia where she managed to defeat Abera Betelhem.

In 2012, Kigeni was among the women team that represented Uganda in the 40th World Chess Olympiad in Istanbul in Turkey. The team also consisted of Ivy Amoko, Goretti Angolikin and Phiona Mutesi.

In 2013, Kigeni won the Women's national championship of Uganda and she was defeated by the Ivy Amoko to become the national champion in 2014.

In 2014, Kigeni was defeated by Ivy Amoko who got 11 points out of 12 points while Kigeni got 10 points and this win made Amoko the women team lead for the five Ugandan women who represented Uganda in the 2014 40th World Chess Olympiad that took place in Tromso, Norway. The Ugandan team consisted of; Ivy Amoko, Grace Kigeni, Christine Namaganda, Goretti Angolikin, and Phiona Mutesi.

In 2015, Kigeni participated in the Zone 4.2 African Chess Championship that took place at City Oil in Kamwokya where became a Woman FIDE Master (WFM) after she finished second. She also participated in the Kawuma Open Chess Championship where she got the third place with 5 points.

In 2016, Kigeni was part of the women team that represented Uganda in the 42nd Chess Olympiad in Baku in Azerbaijan. She was chess columnist in the New Vision and her column was titled "Learn Chess with Chess with Grace Kigeni". She led the Uganda women's team that participated in the 2016 African Individual Championships that were held in Kampala, Uganda.

In 2017, Kigeni participated in the Uganda Open Chess Championship that was held at the Forest Cottages in Bukoto. Participants came from Burundi, Eritrea, Kenya, Namibia, South Sudan and Zambia

In 2018, Kigeni was a member of Tokyo Bilingual Chess Club (TBCC) Team D that participated in the 2018 Japan Club Championship that took place from 23 to 24 September 2018 and was hosted by the Japan Chess Association (JCA).

In 2025, Kigeni took second place in the Idaho Chess Association's Girl's and Women's Championship with 4 points, her first USCF-rated tournament.

== Personal life ==
Kigeni married Kenneth Paul Sengendo. Their marriage took place on the 6 January 2018 at St. Francis, Makerere and their wedding reception at Arirang restaurant. Kigeni and her family currently reside in Meridian, Idaho, where she works as a Service Delivery Manager at Clearwater Analytics.

== Awards and recognitions ==
- Nile Special USPA Female Chess player of 2015 and 2016.
- 2013 Uganda Women's National Chess Champion.

== See also ==
- Phiona Mutesi
- Christine Namaganda
- Uganda Chess Federation
- Ivy Claire Amoko
- Arthur Ssegwanyi
- Goretti Angolikin
