= Sana Omprakash Kayyar =

Ugandan chess player (born 2008)

Personal information
- Born: 19 November 2008 (age 17)

Chess career
- Country: Uganda
- Title: Woman International Master (2026)
- Peak rating: 2072 (March 2026)

Sana Omprakash Kayyar (born 19 November 2008) is a Ugandan chess player who holds the FIDE title of Woman International Master (WIM). She is the first official Woman International Master from East Africa and Uganda's top-rated female player.

== Early life ==
Before moving to Uganda in 2021, she had spent her early childhood in Kenya. Her parents are Omprakash Kayyar and Saritha Kayyar. She has two siblings, Shoubhith Omprakash Kayyar and Shriyam Kayyar.

== Chess Career ==
=== Early international success (2022–2023) ===
Sana made her continental debut at the 2022 African Youth Chess Championship held in Lusaka, Zambia. Competing in the Girls Under-14 section, she scored 7.5 points out of 9, securing the silver medal. This performance earned her the Woman Candidate Master (WCM) title and qualification for the World Youth Chess Championship, in U-14 Girls category, in Constanța, Romania, 2022.

In 2023 she competed at the African Youth Chess Championship held in Cairo, Egypt, where she won the silver medal in the Girls Under-16 category with 7 points from 9 games. She also represented Uganda at the World Youth Chess Championship, in U-16 girls category, held in Montesilvano, Italy, November, 2023 where she gained a massive 153.2 elos.

=== Olympiad debut and Woman FIDE Master title (2024) ===
At the 45th Chess Olympiad held in Budapest, Hungary, in 2024, Sana represented Uganda and earned the Woman FIDE Master (WFM) title. She scored 6.5 points from 9 games on the women's team.

=== Continental Events in 2024 ===
In June 2024, Sana represented Uganda at the Africa Youth Chess Championship held in Johannesburg, South Africa, where she came 4th overall in the U18 Girls catergory. In July 2024, she was the gold meddallist in the U-2300 Women Category, Africa Amateurs held in Bujumbura, Burundi and qualified for World Amateurs in 2025.

=== Rise to Woman International Master (2025) ===
In April 2025, Sana represented Uganda at the inaugural Super Zonal Chess Championship, held in Lagos, Nigeria. In September 2025, she was the silver medallist in African Amateurs, U-2300 Women Category, held in Bujumbura, Burundi.

In September 2025, at the African Junior (U-20) Chess Championship held in Cidade Velha, Santiago Island, Cape Verde, Sana finished second in the Girls’ section with 6.5 points, securing a silver medal and a WIM norm.

In December 2025, at the African Youth Chess Championship in Harare, Zimbabwe, Sana won the gold medal in the Girls Under-18 category with an unbeaten score of 8 points from 9 games (seven wins and two draws). This victory earned her the Woman International Master (WIM) title, making her the first female player from East Africa to achieve the honour. She was also awarded the Fair Play Award for sportsmanship. Her younger brother Shoubhith Omprakash Kayyar won bronze in the Under-16 Open section at the same event.

=== National dominance ===
Sana has been crowned Uganda National Women's Champion on multiple occasions, including the 2026 National Chess Championship, where she finished clear first with 9 points out of 11 rounds. She is the 3-time National Junior Chess Champion in 2023, 2025 and 2026. She has won multiple national grand-prix events, such as, Kireka Chess Championship 2023 and 2025, Kantiti Memorial Chess Championship 2024 and 2025, Zabasajja Memorial Chess Championship in 2024 and 2025.

=== Continental Events in 2026 ===
Sana was the silver medallist in the African Youth Chess Championship, U-18 Girls, held in Entebbe, Uganda in May 2026. In addition, she was gold medallist in the rapid section and silver medallist in blitz section in the same event.

Sana has represented Uganda at the African Individual Chess Championship, Ladies category, held in Jwaneng, Botswana in June 2026.

=== Olympiad 2026 ===
At the 46th Chess Olympiad held in Samarkand, Uzbekistan, in September 2026, Sana played Board 1 for the Uganda women's team in all 11 rounds. She scored 7.5 points (five wins, five draws and one loss), achieving a performance rating of 2084 and gaining approximately 66 Elo points.

WIM Sana Omprakash Kayyar at the 46th FIDE Chess Olympiad in Samarkand, Uzbekistan

As of the October 2026 FIDE rating list, her classical rating stood at 2027, with a career peak of 2072 recorded in March 2026. She is among the top-rated female players in Uganda and East Africa.

=== Titles and achievements ===
==== FIDE titles ====
- Woman Candidate Master (WCM) – 2022(African Youth Chess Championship, Lusaka, Zambia)
- Woman FIDE Master (WFM) – 2024 (Chess Olympiad, Budapest, Hungary)
- Woman International Master (WIM) – 2025 (Africa Youth Chess Championship, Harare, Zimbabwe)

==== Major achievements ====
- Silver – U14 Girls, Africa Youth Chess Championship (Lusaka, Zambia, 2022)
- Silver – U16 Girls, Africa Youth Chess Championship (Cairo, Egypt, 2023)
- Gold – U-2300 Women, African Amateurs (Bujumbura, Burundi, 2024)
- Silver – African Junior Championship, Girls (Cidade Velha,Cape Verde, 2025)
- Gold – Girls U18, Africa Youth Chess Championship (Harare, Zimbabwe, 2025) – first Ugandan gold at AYCC
- Uganda National Women's Champion (multiple times, including 2026)
- Board 1, Uganda women – 46th Chess Olympiad (Samarkand, Uzbekistan, 2026): 7.5/11, performance rating 2084

== See also ==
- Peninah Nakabo
- Christine Namaganda
- Gloria Nansubuga
- Haruna Nsubuga
- Wasswa Mark Nyola
