= Esteri Tebandeke =

Ugandan actress (1984–2026)

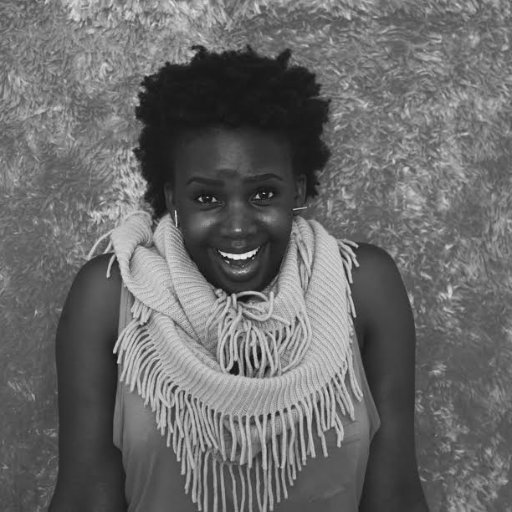
- Tebandeke in 2015
- Born: Esther Brenda Apolot; 16 May 1984; Kampala, Uganda
- Died: 24 March 2026 (aged 41)
- Education: Makerere University
- Occupations: Actress, visual artist
- Years active: 2008–2026
- Spouse: Samuel Tebandeke

Esteri Tebandeke (born Esther Brenda Apolot; 16 May 1984 – 24 March 2026) was a Ugandan filmmaker, actress, dancer, and visual artist. She was a graduate of the Margaret Trowell School of Industrial and Fine Art at Makerere University.

Tebandeke played roles in the films Sins of the Parents (2008), Master on Duty (2009), and Queen of Katwe (2016). Her Broken Shadow (2016) was her first foray into science fiction.

== Early life and education ==
Tebandeke was born in Kampala, Uganda on 16 May 1984, and was of Teso descent. She was the sixth of eight children, and her family lives in Uganda. She attended St. Joseph's Girl's Secondary School in Uganda, and acted in school plays and dance performances.

== Career ==
=== Dance ===
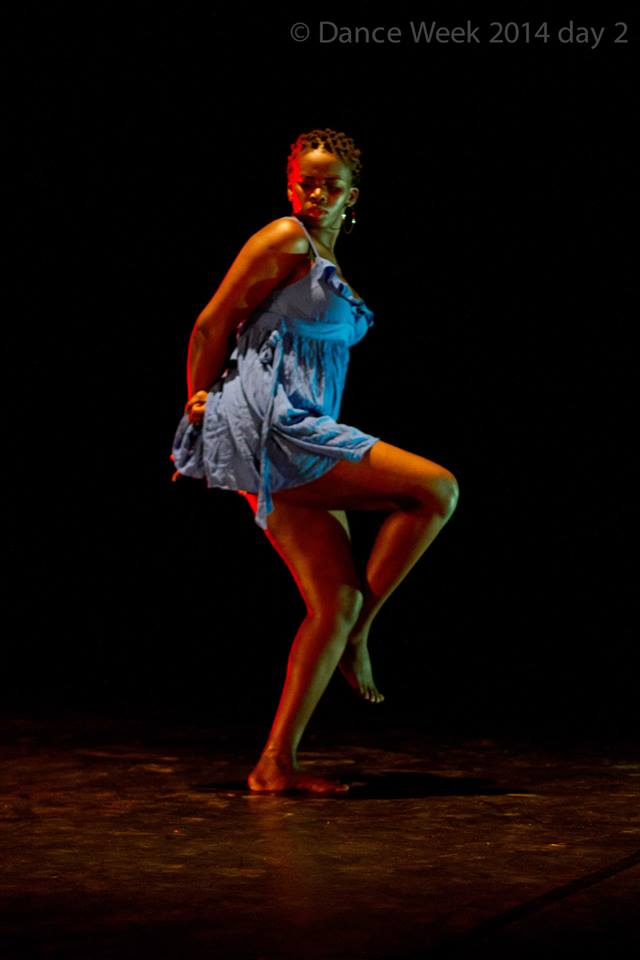
Tebandeke's solo dance performance

Tebandeke started working as a contemporary dancer in 2008. She performed with various dance companies in Uganda, including Keiga Dance Company, Stepping Stones Dance Company, Mutumizi Dance Company, and Guerrilla Dance Company.

She performed at various arts platforms, including Dance Week Uganda, Dance Transmissions Festival (both annual contemporary dance showcases), Bayimba International Festival of the Arts, and Umoja International Festival, the latter initially as a student and then a teacher for three years.

Tebandeke was involved in projects in Kenya, Rwanda, Madagascar, South Africa, Tanzania, the United States of America, and Ethiopia. She performed at La Mama in New York in 2012, Artwater Village Theatre in 2013, and New Orleans Fringe in 2014.

=== Theatre ===
Tebandeke was an actress from 2008, performing in a variety of theatre and film productions in Uganda. Her debut theatre production, Lion and the Jewel, in which she portrayed Sidi, was directed by Kaya Kagimu Mukasa. Her other theatre projects have included Maria Kizito, in which she played the lead role of a psychopathic nun. This is a play by Brown University professor Erik Ehn, and is about the trial of nuns who facilitated the massacre of Tutsis during the Rwandan genocide. She was the lead actress in Cooking Oil, a play by award-winning playwright Deborah Asiimwe, which was performed in Uganda and the United States. Her other theatre roles have included a mentally disturbed psychiatrist in the Ugandan production of The Body of a Woman as a Battlefield, as well as a frustrated wife in The Marriage Chronicles.

In 2015, Tebandeke travelled to the northern part of Uganda with a group of artists, intending to collect stories to turn into stage plays to be presented to audiences around the world. The Story Circle Project, which was headed by Jerry Stropnicky, a theatre practitioner in the United States, gave her great insights into the use of story as a mechanism to help people cope with different aspects of life such as trauma.

She also ventured into directing and worked on a theatre project, Afroman Spice, with the all-female Afroman Ensemble. The project premiered in Kampala in June 2015 and has since been staged at the Market for African Performing Arts (MASA) in Ivory Coast. It was also booked to be performed in Rwanda, Tunisia, and Niger in 2016.

As a teacher, she facilitated training sessions with other arts projects. Her experience also involved instruction of children in schools around the city of Kampala.

=== Film ===
Tebandeke got her first acting role in a short film by the Maisha Film Lab program, a Uganda-based non-profit film training initiative founded by award-winning director Mira Nair for emerging East African and South Asian filmmakers.

She acted in Judith Adong's Sins of the Parents in 2008 and Master on Duty in 2009 by Joseph Ken Ssebaggala.

One of her last film appearances was in the Walt Disney Pictures production Queen of Katwe, starring Academy Award-winning actress Lupita Nyong'o and David Oyelowo. Speaking about the film, Tebandeke describes the impact that Queen of Katwe has had on her:

"Before the film, I was afraid of my dreams because they were so big. But now I am even more scared—they are bigger."

Mira Nair, one of her greatest inspirations in the film industry, describes Tebandeke as "a luminous person."

Tebandeke was committed to developing stories from her home country of Uganda and the African continent, which address themes of local significance but with international appeal. She explored the possibility of developing Ugandan content in collaboration with various creatives in East Africa and beyond.

Her films as an actress and director have been shown at the Toronto International film festival, BFI London Film Festival, Luxor African Film Festival, Raindance Film Festival, Uganda Film Festival, Durban International Film Festival, and the Africa International Film Festival.

She was part of the writing team on a web series being developed in collaboration with film students from Uganda, Kenya, Ghana and Germany. This project was shot on location in Accra, Ghana.

Little Black Dress, her directorial debut, is a short film that was shot on location in Nairobi, Kenya in April 2019. It premiered in competition at the 2019 edition of the Africa International Film Festival in Lagos, Nigeria and in competition at the Luxor African Film Festival.

As an illustrator and cartoonist, Tebandeke hoped to show the world what it meant to be Ugandan in contemporary times.

== Personal life and death ==
Tebandeke was married to Samuel Tebandeke, an Ugandan filmmaker, from 2011 until her death. She lived in Kampala, Uganda.

Tebandeke died on 24 March 2026, at the age of 41, following a long illness.

== Performances ==
=== Film ===
Year	Title	Role	Writer	Producer	Director	Notes
2008	Sins of the Parents	Sister	Judith Adong	Judith Adong	Judith Adong	Short film
2009	Master on Duty	Vicky	Joseph Kenneth Ssebaggala	Joseph Kenneth Ssebaggala	Joseph Kenneth Ssebaggala	Feature film
2016	Queen of Katwe	Sara Katende	William Wheeler	Lydia Dean Pilcher & John Carls	Mira Nair	Feature film
2016	Her Broken Shadow	Adongo and Apio	Dilman Dila	Dilman Dila	Dilman Dila	Feature film
2019	Imperial Blue	Kisakye	Dan Moss & David Cecil	David Cecil	Dan Moss	Feature film
2019	Little Black Dress	Dee	Esteri Tebandeke	Esteri Tebandeke & Samuel Tebandeke	Esteri Tebandeke	Short film
2019	Family Tree	Margaret	Nicole Magabo	Sean Kagugube	Nicole Magabo	Short film
TBC	Downhill		Catherine Bagaya	Solaire Munyana & Emma Kakai	Esteri Tebandeke	Short film
TBC	Kahawa Black	Kana Wamba	Samuel Tebandeke & Esteri Tebandeke	Samuel Tebandeke, Esteri Tebandeke & Juliana Kabua	Esteri Tebandeke	In development
TBC	Conversations With My Mother	Arit	Samuel Tebandeke	Samuel Tebandeke, Esteri Tebandeke & Juliana Kabua	Samuel Tebandeke	In development

=== Theatre ===
Year	Title	Role	Notes
2011	The Lion and the Jewel	Sidi	
2012	Cooking Oil	Maria	
2012	Maria Kizito	Multiple characters	
2013	Cooking Oil	Maria	
2014	Maria Kizito	Maria Kizito	
2015	The Body of a Woman as a Battlefield in the Bosnian War	Kate	
2016	Conversations With My Mother	Multiple characters	
