= Brenda Maraka =

Ugandan fashion designer

- Born: Brenda Niwagaba Maraka; 9 February 1981 (age 45); Soroti Teso, Eastern Uganda
- Citizenship: Ugandan
- Occupations: Fashion, Art and cultural designer
- Awards: Young Achievers Award (2011)

Brenda Niwagaba Maraka (born 9 February 1981) is a Ugandan fashion designer and the founder of the "Brendamaraka" label, launched in 2007. Known for blending Ugandan cultural elements with modern aesthetics, she has made a significant impact on the fashion industry. Maraka gained international recognition by designing outfits for figures like Lupita Nyong’o and Phiona Mutesi for the Queen of Katwe premiere. She began her career designing costumes in school, later training at the London Academy of Design and Dressmaking, graduating in 2005. Brenda is also a mentor to aspiring designers, she has won many Art, Fashion, and Culture Awards.

== Background and education ==
Maraka was born in Soroti-Teso, Eastern Uganda in 1981. She was raised by a single mother Elizabeth Maraka who worked long at the Soroti Flying School and she says is her great inspiration. She used to make dresses for her and remains her stylist to date. Maraka grew up as an only child because her twin siblings died. It is the reason she is also called Akello, meaning ‘follower of twins’

At 13 years old, after completing primary education, Maraka proceeded to Namasagali College in Kamuli for O-level, She then left to Trinity College Nabbingo for A-level. She later enrolled at the London Academy of Design and Dressmaking, where she graduated in 2005 with a degree and diploma in dress making and lingerie design.

== Career ==
Her Career in fashion and design started in 2001 when she left Uganda and spent most of her time in London as a student taking care of her business, Brenda Maraka fashion house. In 2003, she participated at the Uganda International Fashion Week showcasing her work, and the designs quickly gained recognition for their creativity and cultural resonance.

In January 2007, Maraka officially launched her fashion label, "Brendamaraka," with a mission to represent Uganda's tropical identity and elevate Kampala's status as a fashion hub. In 2014 as part of her internship program, Maraka made a runaway showcase during the Uganda International Fashion Week and since then she has she has participated in a number of fashion events both in Uganda and UK.

In 2017, Maraka launched an online fashion store, utilising the digital space provided by internet. She is also passionate about mentoring the next generation of designers especially the youth.

== Achievements ==
- Founded "Brendamaraka" Label (2007) - Maraka launched her eponymous fashion brand in January 2007, with a vision to showcase Uganda's tropical identity and elevate Kampala as a fashion hub. The label has since become synonymous with creativity and cultural pride.
- International Recognition with Queen of Katwe (2016) - She gained global attention by designing outfits for Oscar-winning actress Lupita Nyong’o and Ugandan chess prodigy Phiona Mutesi for the premiere of Disney's Queen of Katwe.
- Young Achievers Award (2011) - Maraka received the Art, Fashion, and Culture Award at the Young Achievers Awards in Uganda, recognizing her contributions to the creative industry.
- Debut at Uganda International Fashion Week (2003) - While still a student at the London Academy of Design and Dressmaking, Maraka showcased her designs at the Uganda International Fashion Week, marking an early milestone in her rise to prominence.
- Dressing Pageant Contestants - She has designed outfits for contestants in Miss Uganda and Miss Tourism Uganda.
- Mentorship and Industry Influence - Beyond her designs, Maraka has mentored young designers, taking on students annually to pass down her skills and inspire the next generation.
- Celebrating a Decade in Fashion (2017) - To mark ten years of her "Brendamaraka" label, she planned a significant fashion show, highlighting her longevity and sustained impact in the industry.
- Cultural Representation - Maraka makes fashion blending Ugandan heritage with contemporary fashion, earning her a spot among the most influential female designers in Uganda and contributing to the global visibility of African fashion.
- Top performer in golf (2022) - Maraka emerged top female performer with 40 points in the Kabaka coronation Anniversary golf Tourney.

== Awards ==
- 2011: Best bridal designer
- 2011: young achievers awards
- 2016: Honourally award for mentorship in fashion and design industry
- 2022: Top performer golf award.
