= Critics' Choice Movie Award for Best Young Performer =

Award given by the Critics Choice Association

Critics Choice Movie Award for Best Young Performer (Actor/Actress)
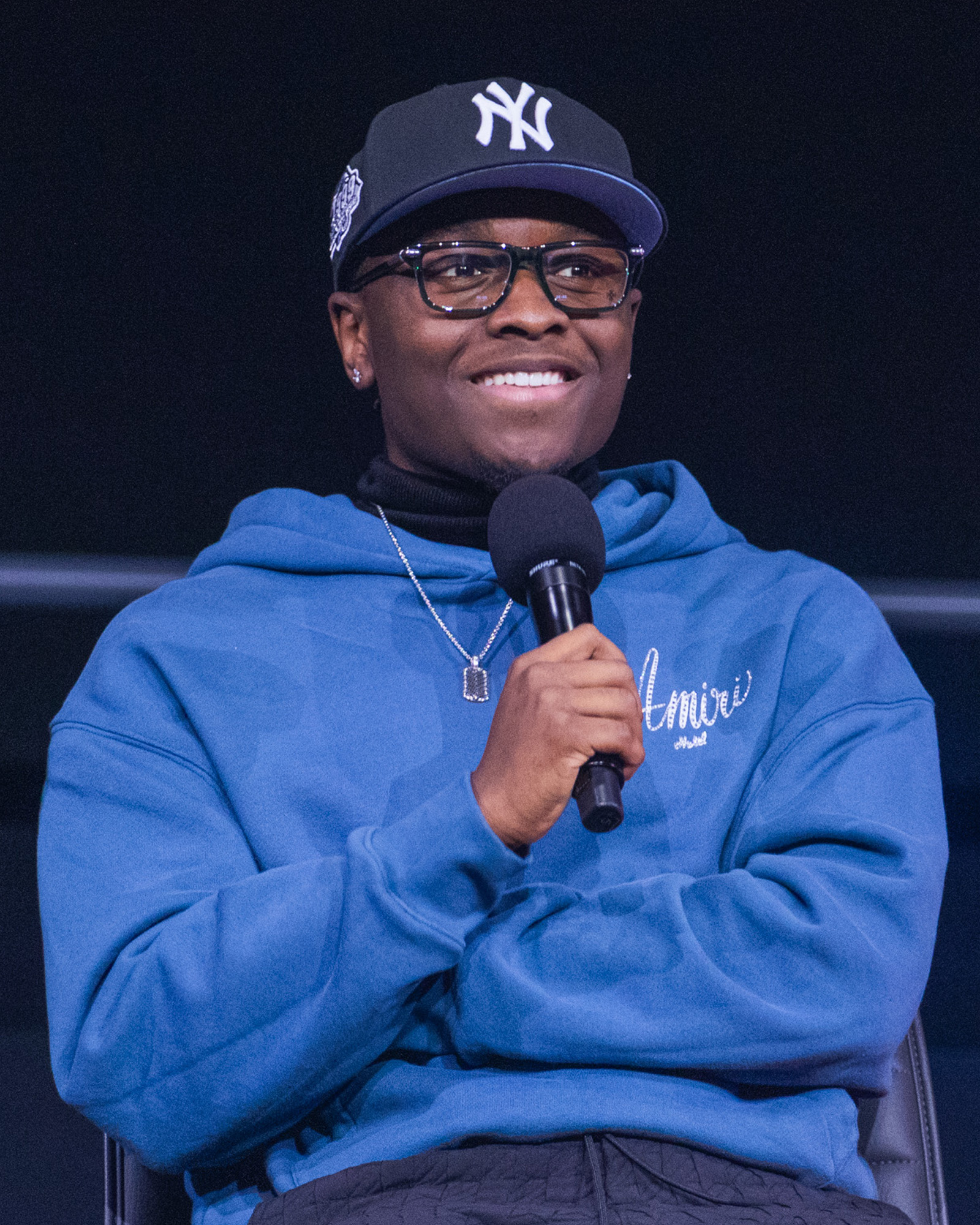
- The 2025 recipient: Miles Caton
- Awarded for: Best Performance by a Young Performer (Actor/Actress)
- Location: Los Angeles, California
- Presented by: Critics Choice Association
- First award: Jonathan Lipnicki for Jerry Maguire (1996)
- Currently held by: Miles Caton for Sinners (2025)
- Website: www.criticschoice.com

The Critics Choice Movie Award for Best Young Performer (Actor/Actress) is one of the awards given to people working in the film industry by the Critics Choice Association (CCA), formerly Broadcast Film Critics Association (BFCA). It has been awarded since the 2nd Critics Choice Awards to an actor or actress (Note: Between 2004 and 2007, it was recognized in separate, gendered categories—Best Young Actor and Best Young Actress—before shifting back to a single, non-gendered performance category in 2008.) for a performance in any role, lead or supporting, in a film released that year. The award's current criteria requires the performer to be eighteen years old or younger at the time of filming.

The Best Young Performer award has been presented a total of 33 times, to 31 performers, with Dakota Fanning and Freddie Highmore receiving the award the most, with two wins each. Fanning also holds the distinction of the most-nominated individual in the category, with five. Daniel Radcliffe, with four nominations, is the most-nominated individual without a win. Chloë Grace Moretz, with her two nominations for Kick-Ass and Let Me In (both 2010), is the only person to be nominated twice in the same year. Eight performances—by Abigail Breslin, Keisha Castle-Hughes, Lucas Hedges, Jennifer Lawrence, Haley Joel Osment, Saoirse Ronan, Hailee Steinfeld, and Quvenzhané Wallis—nominated in this category are also among the youngest to be recognized with nominations at the Academy Awards, though none of them won Academy Awards for the performances they received nominations for in this category at the Critics Choice Awards.

The first recipient of the award was Jonathan Lipnicki for his performance in Jerry Maguire (1996); the most recent winner is Miles Caton for his role in Sinners (2025). Lipnicki also remains the youngest nominee and winner in the category at just 6 years old at the time of his recognition, while Paul Dano, who won in Best Young Actor for Little Miss Sunshine (2006), is the eldest and only person over 21 to both be nominated and win.

== Winners and nominees ==
The following is a full list of the nominees and winners in this category. Performances that also earned a nomination at the Academy Awards are indicated with an asterisk (*).

=== 1990s ===
==== Best Child Performance (1996–2003) ====
Year	Performer	Character	Film
1996	Jonathan Lipnicki	Ray Boyd	Jerry Maguire
1997	Jurnee Smollett	Eve Batiste	Eve's Bayou
1998	Ian Michael Smith	Simon Birch	Simon Birch
1999	Haley Joel Osment* (Note: Nominated for Best Supporting Actor at the 72nd Academy Awards.)	Cole Sear	The Sixth Sense

=== 2000s ===
Year	Performer	Character	Film
2000	Jamie Bell	Billy Elliot	Billy Elliot
2001	Dakota Fanning	Lucy Diamond Dawson	I Am Sam
2001	Haley Joel Osment	David	A.I. Artificial Intelligence
2001	Daniel Radcliffe	Harry Potter	Harry Potter and the Sorcerer's Stone
2002	Kieran Culkin	Jason "Igby" Slocumb Jr.	Igby Goes Down
2002	Tyler Hoechlin	Michael Sullivan Jr.	Road to Perdition
2002	Nicholas Hoult	Marcus Brewer	About a Boy
2002	Daniel Radcliffe	Harry Potter	Harry Potter and the Chamber of Secrets
2003	Keisha Castle-Hughes* (Note: Nominated for Best Actress at the 76th Academy Awards.)	Paikea "Pai" Apirana	Whale Rider
2003	Emma Bolger	Ariel Sullivan	In America
2003	Sarah Bolger	Christy Sullivan	In America
2003	Evan Rachel Wood	Tracy Freeland	Thirteen

==== Best Young Actor (2004–2007) ====
Year	Performer	Character	Film
2004	Freddie Highmore	Peter Llewelyn Davies	Finding Neverland
2004	Liam Aiken	Klaus Baudelaire	Lemony Snicket's A Series of Unfortunate Events
2004	Cameron Bright	Young Sean	Birth
2004	Daniel Radcliffe	Harry Potter	Harry Potter and the Prisoner of Azkaban
2004	William Ullrich	Little Bobby	Beyond the Sea
2005	Freddie Highmore	Charlie Bucket	Charlie and the Chocolate Factory
2005	Jesse Eisenberg	Walt Berkman	The Squid and the Whale
2005	Owen Kline	Frank Berkman	The Squid and the Whale
2005	Alex Etel	Damian Cunningham	Millions
2005	Daniel Radcliffe	Harry Potter	Harry Potter and the Goblet of Fire
2006	Paul Dano	Dwayne Hoover	Little Miss Sunshine
2006	Cameron Bright	Joey Naylor	Thank You for Smoking
2006	Joseph Cross	Augusten Burroughs	Running with Scissors
2006	Freddie Highmore	Max Skinner	A Good Year
2006	Jaden Smith	Christopher Gardner Jr.	The Pursuit of Happyness
2007	Ahmad Khan Mahmoodzada	Young Hassan	The Kite Runner
2007	Michael Cera	Paulie Bleeker	Juno
2007	Freddie Highmore	Evan Taylor / August Rush	August Rush
2007	Edward Sanders	Tobias "Toby" Ragg	Sweeney Todd: The Demon Barber of Fleet Street

==== Best Young Actress (2004–2007) ====
Year	Performer	Character	Film
2004	Emmy Rossum	Christine Daaé	The Phantom of the Opera
2004	Emily Browning	Violet Baudelaire	Lemony Snicket's A Series of Unfortunate Events
2004	Dakota Fanning	Lupita "Pita" Ramos	Man on Fire
2004	Lindsay Lohan	Cady Heron	Mean Girls
2004	Emma Watson	Hermione Granger	Harry Potter and the Prisoner of Azkaban
2005	Dakota Fanning	Rachel Ferrier	War of the Worlds
2005	Flora Cross	Eliza Naumann	Bee Season
2005	Georgie Henley	Lucy Pevensie	The Chronicles of Narnia: The Lion, the Witch and the Wardrobe
2005	Q'orianka Kilcher	Pocahontas	The New World
2005	Emma Watson	Hermione Granger	Harry Potter and the Goblet of Fire
2006	Abigail Breslin* (Note: Nominated for Best Supporting Actress at the 79th Academy Awards.)	Olive Hoover	Little Miss Sunshine
2006	Ivana Baquero	Ofelia	Pan's Labyrinth
2006	Shareeka Epps	Drey	Half Nelson
2006	Dakota Fanning	Fern Arable	Charlotte's Web
2006	Keke Palmer	Akeelah Anderson	Akeelah and the Bee
2007	Nikki Blonsky	Tracy Turnblad	Hairspray
2007	Dakota Blue Richards	Lyra Belacqua	The Golden Compass
2007	AnnaSophia Robb	Leslie Burke	Bridge to Terabithia
2007	Saoirse Ronan* (Note: Nominated for Best Supporting Actress at the 80th Academy Awards.)	Briony Tallis, aged 13	Atonement

==== Best Young Performer (2008–present) ====
Year	Performer	Character	Film
2008	Dev Patel	Jamal Malik	Slumdog Millionaire
2008	Dakota Fanning	Lily Owens	The Secret Life of Bees
2008	David Kross	Young Michael Berg	The Reader
2008	Brandon Walters	Nullah	Australia
2009	Saoirse Ronan	Susie Salmon	The Lovely Bones
2009	Jae Head	Sean "S.J." Tuohy Jr.	The Blind Side
2009	Bailee Madison	Isabelle Cahill	Brothers
2009	Max Records	Max	Where the Wild Things Are
2009	Kodi Smit-McPhee	Boy	The Road

=== 2010s ===
Year	Performer	Character	Film
2010	Hailee Steinfeld* (Note: Nominated for Best Supporting Actress at the 83rd Academy Awards.)	Mattalyn "Mattie" Ross	True Grit
2010	Elle Fanning	Cleo	Somewhere
2010	Jennifer Lawrence* (Note: Nominated for Best Actress at the 83rd Academy Awards.)	Ree Dolly	Winter's Bone
2010	Chloë Grace Moretz	Mindy Macready / Hit-Girl	Kick-Ass
2010	Chloë Grace Moretz	Abby	Let Me In
2010	Kodi Smit-McPhee	Owen	Let Me In
2011	Thomas Horn	Oskar Schell	Extremely Loud & Incredibly Close
2011	Asa Butterfield	Hugo Cabret	Hugo
2011	Elle Fanning	Alice Dainard	Super 8
2011	Ezra Miller	Kevin Khatchadourian	We Need to Talk About Kevin
2011	Saoirse Ronan	Hanna Heller	Hanna
2011	Shailene Woodley	Alexandra "Alex" King	The Descendants
2012	Quvenzhané Wallis* (Note: Nominated for Best Actress at the 85th Academy Awards.)	Hushpuppy	Beasts of the Southern Wild
2012	Elle Fanning	Ginger	Ginger & Rosa
2012	Kara Hayward	Suzy Bishop	Moonrise Kingdom
2012	Tom Holland	Lucas Bennett	The Impossible
2012	Logan Lerman	Charlie Kelmeckis	The Perks of Being a Wallflower
2012	Suraj Sharma	Piscine "Pi" Patel	Life of Pi
2013	Adèle Exarchopoulos	Adèle	Blue Is the Warmest Colour
2013	Asa Butterfield	Andrew "Ender" Wiggin	Ender's Game
2013	Liam James	Duncan	The Way Way Back
2013	Sophie Nélisse	Liesel Meminger	The Book Thief
2013	Tye Sheridan	Ellis	Mud
2014	Ellar Coltrane	Mason Evans Jr.	Boyhood
2014	Ansel Elgort	Augustus Waters	The Fault in Our Stars
2014	Mackenzie Foy	Murphy "Murph" Cooper	Interstellar
2014	Jaeden Martell	Oliver Bronstein	St. Vincent
2014	Tony Revolori	Zero Moustafa	The Grand Budapest Hotel
2014	Quvenzhané Wallis	Annie Bennett	Annie
2014	Noah Wiseman	Samuel Vanek	The Babadook
2015	Jacob Tremblay	Jack Newsome	Room
2015	Abraham Attah	Agu	Beasts of No Nation
2015	RJ Cyler	Earl Jackson	Me and Earl and the Dying Girl
2015	Shameik Moore	Malcolm Adekanbi	Dope
2015	Milo Parker	Roger Munro	Mr. Holmes
2016	Lucas Hedges* (Note: Nominated for Best Supporting Actor at the 89th Academy Awards.)	Patrick Chandler	Manchester by the Sea
2016	Alex R. Hibbert	Child Chiron / "Little"	Moonlight
2016	Lewis MacDougall	Conor O'Malley	A Monster Calls
2016	Madina Nalwanga	Phiona Mutesi	Queen of Katwe
2016	Sunny Pawar	Young Saroo	Lion
2016	Hailee Steinfeld	Nadine Franklin	The Edge of Seventeen
2017	Brooklynn Prince	Moonee	The Florida Project
2017	Mckenna Grace	Mary Adler	Gifted
2017	Dafne Keen	Laura Kinney / X-23	Logan
2017	Millicent Simmonds	Rose	Wonderstruck
2017	Jacob Tremblay	August "Auggie" Pullman	Wonder
2018	Elsie Fisher	Kayla Day	Eighth Grade
2018	Thomasin McKenzie	Tom	Leave No Trace
2018	Ed Oxenbould	Joe Brinson	Wildlife
2018	Millicent Simmonds	Regan Abbott	A Quiet Place
2018	Amandla Stenberg	Starr Carter	The Hate U Give
2018	Sunny Suljic	Stevie	Mid90s
2019	Roman Griffin Davis	Johannes "Jojo" Betzler	Jojo Rabbit
2019	Julia Butters	Trudi Frazer	Once Upon a Time in Hollywood
2019	Shahadi Wright Joseph	Zora Wilson / Umbrae	Us
2019	Noah Jupe	Otis Lort (12)	Honey Boy
2019	Thomasin McKenzie	Elsa Korr	Jojo Rabbit
2019	Archie Yates	Yorki	Jojo Rabbit

=== 2020s ===
Year	Performer	Character	Film
2020	Alan Kim	David Yi	Minari
2020	Ryder Allen	Sam Burdette	Palmer
2020	Ibrahima Gueye	Momo	The Life Ahead
2020	Talia Ryder	Skylar	Never Rarely Sometimes Always
2020	Caoilinn Springall	Young Iris	The Midnight Sky
2020	Helena Zengel	Johanna Leonberger / Cicada	News of the World
2021	Jude Hill	Buddy	Belfast
2021	Cooper Hoffman	Gary Valentine	Licorice Pizza
2021	Emilia Jones	Ruby Rossi	CODA
2021	Woody Norman	Jesse	C'mon C'mon
2021	Saniyya Sidney	Venus Williams	King Richard
2021	Rachel Zegler	María Vasquez	West Side Story
2022	Gabriel LaBelle	Samuel "Sammy" Fabelman	The Fabelmans
2022	Frankie Corio	Sophie Paterson	Aftersun
2022	Jalyn Hall	Emmett Till	Till
2022	Bella Ramsey	Catherine / Birdy	Catherine Called Birdy
2022	Banks Repeta	Paul Graff	Armageddon Time
2022	Sadie Sink	Ellie Sarsfield	The Whale
2023	Dominic Sessa	Angus Tully	The Holdovers
2023	Abby Ryder Fortson	Margaret Simon	Are You There God? It's Me, Margaret.
2023	Ariana Greenblatt	Sasha	Barbie
2023	Calah Lane	Noodle	Wonka
2023	Milo Machado-Graner	Daniel Maleski	Anatomy of a Fall
2023	Madeleine Yuna Voyles	Alpha-O / Alphie	The Creator
2024	Maisy Stella	Elliott LaBrant	My Old Ass
2024	Alyla Browne	Young Furiosa	Furiosa: A Mad Max Saga
2024	Elliott Heffernan	George	Blitz
2024	Izaac Wang	Chris Wang	Dìdi
2024	Alisha Weir	Abigail Lazaar	Abigail
2024	Zoe Ziegler	Lacy	Janet Planet
2025	Miles Caton	Samuel "Sammie" Moore	Sinners
2025	Everett Blunck	Ben	The Plague
2025	Cary Christopher	Alex Lilly	Weapons
2025	Shannon Mahina Gorman	Mia Kawasaki	Rental Family
2025	Jacobi Jupe	Hamnet Shakespeare	Hamnet
2025	Nina Ye	I-Jing	Left-Handed Girl

== Multiple wins ==
=== 2 wins ===
- Dakota Fanning
- Freddie Highmore

== Multiple nominations ==
=== 5 nominations ===
- Dakota Fanning (2 consecutive)

=== 4 nominations ===
- Freddie Highmore (consecutive)
- Daniel Radcliffe (2x2 consecutive)

=== 3 nominations ===
- Elle Fanning (consecutive)
- Saoirse Ronan

=== 2 nominations ===
- Cameron Bright
- Asa Butterfield
- Thomasin McKenzie (consecutive)
- Chloë Grace Moretz (simultaneous)
- Haley Joel Osment
- Millicent Simmonds (consecutive)
- Kodi Smit-McPhee (consecutive)
- Hailee Steinfeld
- Jacob Tremblay
- Quvenzhané Wallis
- Emma Watson (consecutive)
