= David Cecil =

David Cecil may refer to:

- David Cecil (courtier) (c. 1460–?1540), MP for Stamford 1504–1523
- David Cecil, 3rd Earl of Exeter (c. 1600–1643), 17th Century British MP and peer
- Lord David Cecil (1902–1986), British biographer, literary scholar and academic
- David Cecil, 6th Marquess of Exeter (1905–1981), British athlete, sports official and Conservative politician
- David Cecil (producer), British theatre producer
