= Back to Life (Alicia Keys song) =

Single by Alicia Keys

from the album Queen of Katwe
- Released: September 1, 2016
- Genre: Soul; R&B
- Length: 4:52
- Label: RCA
- Songwriters: Alicia Keys; Carlo Montagnese; Billy Walsh
- Producers: Alicia Keys; Illangelo

Alicia Keys singles chronology
"In Common" (2016)	"Back to Life" (2016)	"Blended Family (What You Do for Love)" (2016)

Music video
- "Back to Life (Lyrics)" on YouTube

"Back to Life" is a song by American singer-songwriter Alicia Keys, released on September 1, 2016, for the soundtrack of the sports drama film Queen of Katwe, directed by Mira Nair. The song was written by Alicia Keys, Illangelo, and Billy Walsh while production of the song was handled by Keys and Illangelo.

== Background and release ==
“Queen of Katwe” is based on the true story of 10-year-old girl Phiona from Uganda, who becomes an international chess champion. Disney approached Keys to do a song for the film, and Keys started to work on the song alongside Illangelo and Billy Walsh after seeing the film and after being blown away by its authenticity and honesty. The song was announced on August 31, and a featurette featuring Keys singing and discussing the inspiration behind writing the song, was released. Keys further explained that:

I started thinking about this girl, Phiona. This is a young person trying to figure out who she is and where she’s going to be and how that even related to me and my life now. We’re always redefining who we are and redefining who we’re going to be. In so many ways, that’s what brings you back to life. That’s what brings you that feeling of ‘I have to live and I have to be my greatest.

"Back to Life" was released on September 31, 2016. The song is an R&B song and lasts for a duration of four minutes and fifty-two seconds. According to Musicnotes.com, the song is performed in the key of G minor with a tempo of 115 beats per minute in common time. Keys' vocals span from D3 to F5 in the song.

== Critical reception ==
"Back to Life" was generally well received by music critics. According to OkayAfrica "[t]he new track kicks off with piano, swaying guitars and a subdued melody before shifting gears into a synth-backed dance beat" and "[i]ts second half ends up moving towards the sonic world of Keys’ previous single “In Common,”. Tom Breihan from Stereogum was disappointed that the song isn't a Soul II Soul cover, but he felt that the song "has that group somewhere in its DNA", and went on to say that the song "starts out like a more traditional movie-soundtrack end-credits showstopper, but then a beat drops in and it turns into a slinky dance jam". Rap-Up was positive, commenting that the song features "inspirational strings" over which Keys "belts out a moving ode to resilience". In a review for the Queen of Katwe soundtrack, Alex Reif of LaughingPlace.com referred to the song as a "beautiful ballad". He additionally stated that, despite its appeal, a few of the other songs on the album ended up overshadowing the song. That Grape Juice described the song as "rousing", "inspirational" and "moving" and noted that the "production has many interesting layers" but concluded that the "repetitive chorus prevents this from being anything more than a soundtrack song". Hype commented that the song is "[m]ade-up of a smooth ballad" and it is a "perfect sonic balance". Sarah Murphy from Exlaim wrote that the song features a "cinematic feel with sparse instrumentation and breathy vocals", adding that midway a "drum beat kicks in and gets matched with bubbling synths and booming bass". Ryan Reed from Rolling Stone commented that the song features Keys "tossing out confessional lyrics through melismatic vocal swoops" before acknowledging that the "cathartic track morphs from a minimalist piano ballad to an uptempo electro-pop jam".

== Live performances ==
Keys performed the song on Today on September 3, 2016. Keys performed the song at the Apple Music Festival in Roundhouse, London.

== Accolades ==
Award	Date of ceremony	Category	Recipient(s)	Result	Ref.
Black Reel Awards	February 16, 2017	Outstanding Original Song	"Back to Life" – Alicia Keys, Illangelo and Billy Walsh	Nominated	

== Release history ==
Release history and formats for "Back to Life"
Region	Date	Format	Label	Ref.
United States	September 1, 2016	Digital download; streaming	RCA	
