= Nansubuga =

Nansubuga is a name. Notable people with the name include:

- Gloria Nansubuga (born 2001), Ugandan chess player
- Jennifer Nansubuga Makumbi (born 1960s), Ugandan-British novelist
