= Imperial Blue (film) =

- Official 2020 poster
- Directed by: Dan Moss
- Written by: David Cecil and Dan Moss
- Produced by: David Cecil
- Starring: Nicolas Fagerberg
- Cinematography: Ezequiel Romero
- Music by: David Bryceland
- Release date: 20 September 2019 (Raindance Film Festival)
- Running time: 93 minutes
- Countries: United Kingdom; Uganda; India
- Language: English

Imperial Blue is a 2019 psychedelic fantasy thriller, filmed on location in India, the UK and Uganda. It is the debut feature of British writer-director Dan Moss, Ugandan producer Semulema Daniel Katenda and British writer-producer David Cecil.

== Overview ==
Combining magical realism and post-colonial satire, Imperial Blue is a contemporary take on the "white man in Africa" narrative, set mainly in western Uganda.

American smuggler Hugo Winter travels to Uganda to find the source of Bulu, a mysterious shamanic drug with prophetic powers. After being robbed and beaten up in a downtown brothel, Hugo is rescued by two sisters who offer to help him, but they are both competing for his money. As they journey together deep into the forest, their uneasy alliance comes apart with horrifying consequences.

== Plot ==
While buying kilos of hashish in India, American smuggler Hugo Winter is offered a sample of a rare herb from Uganda called Bulu, which is said to bestow the powers of prophecy. In a Bulu trance, Hugo has a shocking, mystical vision of himself in Uganda. When things go badly for him in India, Hugo flees home to his family in London. Now deep in debt to dangerous gangsters, Hugo must find a way out, fast. Acting on his prophetic vision, Hugo travels to Africa to find more of this life-changing new drug and solve his money problems.

In Uganda, Hugo's Bulu visions lead him to a god-fearing farmer called Kisakye. This strong-willed young lady has unwillingly inherited the role of her late father, the village shaman, who cultivated and took Bulu to protect his village. Since the death of her father, Kisakye's ancestral land has been grabbed by the local pastor, Isaac. While Kisakye distrusts Bulu as ‘Satanic’, she needs money and agrees to work with Hugo to sell the drug abroad. However, Kisakye's sister, Angela, has her own plans. She is working with a criminal gang to try and get Bulu out into the world market and sees Hugo as both an opportunity and a threat. After a close call with the criminal gang, Hugo and Kisakye travel deep into the Ugandan forest to the remote village of Makaana, where Kisakye cultivates Bulu in secret. Soon after they arrive, Hugo finds himself contending with the suspicions of the villagers and with the competing agendas of Kisakye and Angela. Kisakye is more honest, but she is uncomfortable with Hugo's wild ways and her new role as a drug dealer.

Hugo earns respect in the village when he prophesies, in a Bulu vision, the drowning of a local boy and manages to save him. However, pastor Isaac becomes bitterly angry with Hugo and Kisakye, accusing them of dividing the community. Meanwhile, Angela's eagerness to close a deal with Hugo becomes increasingly appealing when he receives news from London that his family has been attacked and he must return immediately.

Hugo's attempts to force Kisakye to give him her Bulu backfire and she pushes him away from the village with only a single hit of Bulu to take home. On the road home he takes the Bulu and has a vision of Kisakye being assaulted by pastor Isaac. Hugo returns to rescue Kisakye and, in the ensuing melee, the pastor is killed.

During the chaos, Angela steals Kisakye's supply of Bulu and flees from the village into the forest, pursued by Hugo and Angela. When Hugo catches up with Angela, she is killed in a violent struggle. Hugo, injured and lost in the forest, takes a very large amount of Bulu in an attempt to see his way out of the situation. Instead, the overdose pushes him into the shadow world of Bulu spirits and finally reduces him to a brain-dead state of limbo. Kisakye finds his comatose body and takes the money he had saved to buy the Bulu.

== Cast ==
- Nicolas Fagerberg as Hugo Winter
- Rehema Nanfuka as Angella
- Esteri Tebandeke as Kisakye
- Andrew Benon Kibuuka as Pastor Isaac
- Paul Dewdney as Spiral Matt
- Ashish Verma as Sanjay
- Durassie Kiangangu as Mugisha
- Kayiwa Nicholas as Pape
- Abby Mukiibi Nkaaga as John
- Wilson Egessa as Bob
- Michael Wawuyo as Kitonsa
- Dumba Amina as Destiny
- Nalubiri Ruth as Aunt Betty
- Mwesigwa Ivan Rad as The Crier
- Esther Bacia as Mad Rose

== Reception ==
Imperial Blue has received largely positive reviews, praising its direction, cinematography, locations, acting and original narrative. Mark Kermode reviewed the film on BBC Five Live, saying that although its narrative was "convoluted", "Imperial Blue is a film which is ambitious with high ideas... willing to go the extra mile and not be formulaic". Kermode favourably compared director Dan Moss to cult film director Richard Stanley.

Jane Alexandra Foster of Britflicks awarded the film four stars, saying "this is debut film making at its best... Imperial Blue also has that rare thing, a meeting of a good concept and great execution. Here craft, thought and effort has matched the vision, and many audiences will benefit. Imperial Blue is layered, interesting, entertaining and thought provoking."

Franglais 27 Tales praised the film's attention to gender and colonialism in Africa: "Imperial Blue provides a unique perspective within the colonialism trope with a compelling focus on Ugandan traditions and the female sphere."

Ellen E Jones of The Guardian praised the "impressive locations" and singled out the performances of Esteri Tebandeke and Rehema Nanfuka as "excellent", but was critical of the decision to focus on a white male lead. "Imperial Blue aims at a knowing satire of colonial arrogance, yet still, somehow, it’s all about the white guy."

David Erdos of the International Times found the story to be in the tradition of the best dystopian science fiction: "Imperial Blue is a trip Philip K. Dick might have taken... the kind of Science Fiction that JG Ballard celebrated".

As of October 2021, 75% of reviews compiled on review aggregator Rotten Tomatoes are positive.

== Festivals and release ==
Imperial Blue had its world premiere at Raindance Film Festival (London) in 2019, was awarded Best Dramatic Feature at the 2020 Philip K Dick Film Festival (USA), was selected for the 2020 Mashariki International Film Festival (Rwanda) and was awarded Best Fantasy Film at the 2020 Another Hole in the Head Film Festival (USA).

Release dates:

United Kingdom - 18 January 2021

DVD release - 8 February 2021

United States - 6 April 2021

Rest of the world to be announced.

== Production ==
Most of the crew of Imperial Blue, at all levels of seniority, were teachers, graduates and students of Kampala Film School, which producer-writer David Cecil founded in 2011 and at which director Dan Moss lectured in 2012–16. Ugandan professionals were hired as crew wherever possible, with only 3 foreign crew flown in. The production team offered an Apprenticeship Programme to give aspiring Ugandan film-makers a chance to practice their skills on the set of a film that was relatively well-funded compared to the average Uganda production. Imperial Blue was, in this sense, the culmination of the two British film-makers' engagement with the Ugandan film industry, and their attempts to build capacity therein through education and co-production.
