= Goretti Angolikin =

Ugandan chess player (born 1986)

Personal information
- Born: 1986 (age 39–40)

Chess career
- Country: Uganda
- Title: Woman FIDE Master (2015)
- Peak rating: 1747 (March 2024)

Goretti Angolikin (born 1986) is a Ugandan chess player. She had held the FIDE title of Woman FIDE Master since 2015. In 2019, she attended the first edition of the Open Mind Chess Rapids which took place at the Kyadondo Rugby Club, in Kampala, Uganda.

== Background and education ==
In 2017, she got a tie for the first spot in the Ladies category, with her and WFM Ivy Claire Amoko both garnering 6 points. Angolikin later took the day on a tie-break as she won her first Rwabushenyi title. Angolikin was rated 1638 and finished the sixth overall. In 2010, she was named the chess player of the year. In 2013, during the National Chess championship, she scored 3.5 points and qualified to join the only 3 rated lady players; Grace Kigeni, Ivy Claire Amoko and Phiona Mutesa in the ladies finals for National Chess Championship. In 2014, she was among the strong team of five ladies picked by the Uganda Chess Federation (UCF) to represent the country in the women's category at the 2014 World Chess Olympiad due August 1–15 in Tromso, Norway. In 2012, she was at the 40th World Chess Olympiad which had the women's team such as Grace Kigeni, Clare Amoko, Phiona Mutesi, and Rita Nsubuga.

She studied population science at Makerere University.

== See also ==
- International Chess Federation
- Phiona Mutesi
- Grace Kigeni
