= Gloria Nansubuga =

Ugandan chess player (born 2001)

Personal information
- Born: November 12, 2001 (age 24) Kampala, Uganda

Chess career
- Country: Uganda
- Title: Woman FIDE Master (2018)
- Peak rating: 1706 (February 2026)

Gloria Nansubuga (born November 12, 2001) is a Ugandan chess player who became the youngest chess player in Ugandan history to be awarded a chess title of Woman FIDE Master by the year 2018.

== Background and education ==
Nansubuga was born to Lydia and Wilson Kasende, in Kampala's Katwe slum, made famous by Phiona Mutesi whose life is immortalized by the film Queen of Katwe co-starring Oscar winner Lupita Nyong'o.

She studied from Namirembe Infant Nursery and Primary, then St.Mbuga Vocational Secondary school in Makindye for her secondary level.

She started playing chess at the age of four years, under the guidance of her coach Richard Kakande who also doubled as her chess teacher at St Mbuga Vocational school.

She later joined the Sports Outreach Ministry (SOM) Chess Academy and Mentoring Center in Kampala.

== Career ==
At the age of 13, Nansubuga won the Best Female Honour at the Rwabushenyi Memorial Chess tournament and was Uganda's leading U-14 player and sixth overall female chess player.

She secured the world chess title at World Chess Olympiad in Batumi, Georgia hence becoming a Woman FIDE master, the third highest rank in the game of chess.

She was awarded the title of Woman Fide Master (WFM) after attaining the minimum requirement of finishing with 6/9 points.She bypassed Woman candidate master (WCM) to become Woman FIDE master, becoming the first Ugandan to make such a leap in the tournament.

Her character was taken up by an actor, the late Nikita Pearl Waligwa in the movie Queen of Katwe as the young girl that taught Phiona Mutesi how to play chess.

== See also ==
- Uganda Chess Federation
- International Chess Federation
- Woman Fide Master
- Ivy Claire Amoko
- Namaganda Christine
