= Queen of Katwe =

2016 American biographical sports drama film

- Theatrical release poster
- Directed by: Mira Nair
- Screenplay by: William Wheeler
- Based on: The Queen of Katwe by Tim Crothers
- Produced by: John Carls; Lydia Dean Pilcher
- Starring: David Oyelowo; Lupita Nyong'o; Madina Nalwanga
- Cinematography: Sean Bobbitt
- Edited by: Barry Alexander Brown
- Music by: Alex Heffes
- Production companies: Walt Disney Pictures; ESPN Films; Cine Mosaic; Mirabai Films
- Distributed by: Walt Disney Studios; Motion Pictures
- Release dates: September 10, 2016 (TIFF); September 23, 2016 (United States)
- Running time: 124 minutes
- Country: United States
- Languages: English; Luganda
- Budget: $15 million
- Box office: $10.4 million

Queen of Katwe is a 2016 American biographical sports drama film directed by Mira Nair and written by William Wheeler. Starring David Oyelowo, Lupita Nyong'o, and Madina Nalwanga, the film depicts the life of Phiona Mutesi, a girl living in Katwe, a slum of Kampala, the capital of Uganda. She learns to play chess and becomes a Woman Candidate Master after her victories at World Chess Olympiads.

Adapted from an ESPN magazine article and book by Tim Crothers, the film was co-produced by Walt Disney Pictures and ESPN Films. Queen of Katwe was screened at the 2016 Toronto International Film Festival. The film had a limited release in the United States on September 23, 2016, before a general theatrical release on September 30. It received critical acclaim and secured several awards among numerous nominations.

== Plot ==
Living in Katwe, a slum in Kampala, the Capital City of Uganda, is a constant struggle for 10-year-old Phiona Mutesi (Madina Nalwanga), her mother Nakku Harriet (Lupita Nyong'o) and younger members of her family. She and her younger brother help their mother sell maize in the market. She also helps care for her baby brother. Her world changes one day when she meets Robert Katende (David Oyelowo) at a missionary program. Katende coaches football and teaches children to play chess at a local center. Curious, Phiona approaches and learns the game. She becomes fascinated with the game and soon becomes a top player in the group under Katende's guidance.

Her coach, over the initial opposition of the local chess authorities, takes her and the team to a national school level tournament at a prestigious local school. The group initially finds itself ill at ease among the other participants and the more affluent surroundings. However, their talent wins the day and Phiona comes in first place.

The film then proceeds to trace the ups and downs of success at competitions and tournaments for Phiona and her fellow Pioneers. The struggles of life in Katwe are ever present and Phiona hopes that chess will provide a means of escape from Katwe for her and her family.

Phiona leads the Uganda team at the Chess Olympiad in Russia, confident that she will become a Grandmaster, securing the necessary finances to lift her family out of poverty. However, the competition proves too tough, and she yields to her Canadian opponent.

Phiona returns to Katwe, dejected and doubting her abilities. However, with the support of Coach Katende and the people of Katwe, she returns to chess, ultimately succeeding to the extent that she can purchase a home for her family.

== Cast ==
- Madina Nalwanga as Phiona Mutesi
- David Oyelowo as Robert Katende
- Lupita Nyong'o as Nakku Harriet
- Martin Kabanza as Mugabi Brian
- Taryn "Kay" Kyaze as Night, Phiona's older sister
- Ronald Ssemaganda as Ivan
- Ethan Nazario Lubega as Benjamin
- Nikita Pearl Waligwa as Gloria Nansubuga, Phiona's friend
- Edgar Kanyike as Joseph
- Esther Tebandeke as Sara Katende
- Peter Odeke as Mr. Barumba
- Sheebah Karungi as Shakira
- Joanitta Bewulira-Wandera as Mrs. Gali
- Maurice Kirya as Theo
- Ntare Mwine as Tendo,
- Gladys Oyenbot as Shopkeeper
- Rehema Nanfuka Nurse
- Sarah Kisawuzi as Katende's Grandmother
- Richard Tuwangye as Dez
- Joel Okuyo Prynce as Ggaba Merchant
- Russel Savadier as Russian Chess Official
- Zohran Mamdani as Bookie Student
- Aaron Moloisi as Rwabushenyi Official
- Carina Nel as Kagramanov, a Canadian player
- Maggie Benedict as Chess Federation Secretary
- Rori Motuba as Christine Namaganda
- Rayan Ssewanyana as Chess Pioneer

== Production ==
Queen of Katwe is a biographical sports drama film.

=== Development ===
Tim Crothers wrote the book The Queen of Katwe: A Story of Life, Chess, and One Extraordinary Girl's Dream of Becoming a Grandmaster, which chronicled Phiona Mutesi's life. Published by ESPN in 2012, it was optioned that same year by Walt Disney Pictures. Tendo Nagenda, Walt Disney Studios' senior creative executive, who is from a Ugandan ethnic group, developed the project into production. With executive approval from studio president Sean Bailey, Nagenda went to visit Mira Nair at her Ugandan home to recruit her to direct a film about Mutesi. Nair was captivated by the story, stating, "I have always been surrounded by these local stories but hadn’t done anything in Uganda since 1991. I love any story about people who make something from what appears to be nothing."

Nair directed the film with the script written by William Wheeler. Mira Nair met with Mutesi, her mother Harriet, and the chess group run by coach Robert Katende. She invited screenwriter William Wheeler to come to Kampala to conduct interviews with the principal figures as a foundation for a screenplay. Nair filmed a high-concept short and presented it to Disney, to alleviate the studio's concerns about the film being entirely set in Africa.

Wheeler believed that the film could fit within the Disney tradition of films about "underdog" sports stories, noting that:

"we were trying to ... gently expand the idea of what a 'Disney film' could be. Disney was very open to wanting to tell an aspirational story about someone from someplace that is not at all familiar to Western audiences ... this could really fit into one of the things that they do very well – which is telling sports underdog stories and finding the ways the story naturally intersects with that genre of film."

Nair described Queen of Katwe as "a radical film for Disney in many ways.... It has beauty and barbarity side-by-side." In January 2015, Disney studio chairman Alan F. Horn greenlit the film into production for US$15 million.

Nair's son, Zohran Kwame Mamdani, is listed as third assistant director on the IMDb entry for the film.

=== Casting ===
In January 2015, David Oyelowo and Lupita Nyong'o were cast as Robert Katende and Harriet Mutesi, respectively. They were Nair's first choices for the roles. Nyong'o said that she had decided to play the part after reading the script's first ten pages, saying "It was the first time I felt really awakened by a script and super challenged." Oyelowo immediately accepted the role, seeing the film as a "subversive work", given the lack of diversity in contemporary American cinema. Nair said that finding an actress to play Phiona was the most difficult. The casting search lasted from July to December 2014 and the production team auditioned nearly 700 girls. The casting director found Madina Nalwanga in a community dance class. The 15-year-old Ugandan dancer was cast as Phiona.

Nair's son Zohran featured as an extra ("Bookie student") in the film.

=== Filming ===
Principal photography began in April 2015. The film was shot in the Katwe slums in Kampala, Uganda and in Johannesburg, South Africa. More than one hundred Ugandans were hired as extras for the street scenes; eighty had no prior experience with cameras. Nair set up an acting boot camp to help prepare the children for their scenes. Most professional Ugandan actors settled for roles as extras, including Gladys Oyenbot who acted as Lupita's stand-in double.

Nair and cinematographer Sean Bobbitt used different visual approaches for the various matches which Mutesi plays. Katende, who was present at the shoot, designed the games, while Nair and Bobbitt worked on each shot. The chess scenes were complicated because the call sheet contained actual chess moves. Nair and editor Barry Brown cut the scenes to create some drama. Production wrapped in June 2015 after 54 days of shooting.

=== Music ===
The musical score for Queen of Katwe was composed by Alex Heffes. Heffes added that "It's a very thematic and gentle score that is more orchestral than something like Roots, although it's set in Africa [...] There are plenty of authentic Ugandan needle drop tracks in the film to set the scene so the score could concentrate more on the music story telling."

Linda Cohen, along with Nair's son Zohran, were music supervisors on the film, for which they were nominated for the Guild of Music Supervisors Award for Best Music Supervision for Films Budgeted Under $25 Million. One of Zohran's songs, performed with his friend Ugandan rapper HAB, under his rapper pseudonym Young Cardamom, "#1 Spice", featured in the film. Zohran also curated and produced the soundtrack.

Alicia Keys wrote and recorded the song "Back to Life" for the film; it was released on September 9, 2016, by RCA Records.

The official soundtrack album was released on September 23 by Walt Disney Records, with its deluxe edition also releasing the same day.

=== Economic benefit ===
The film reportedly injected 29.5 million Ugandan Shillings into Kampala's economy and created employment for 400 people.

== Release ==
Queen of Katwe had its world premiere at the 2016 Toronto International Film Festival on September 10. Disney held the corporate premiere at the El Capitan Theatre in Hollywood on September 20, with another screening at the Urban World Festival on September 22. The African premieres were held in Kampala on October 1 and Johannesburg on October 5. The film had its European debut at the 2016 BFI London Film Festival on October 9. Another screening was held at the Morelia International Film Festival in Mexico on October 22. On November 12, it was screened at the Taipei Golden Horse Film Festival and at the Brisbane Asia Pacific Film Festival on the 24th.

The film had a limited release in the United States on September 23, 2016, before a general theatrical release on September 30.

Walt Disney Studios Home Entertainment released the film on Blu-ray and DVD on January 31, 2017, with a digital release on January 10.

== Reception ==
=== Box office ===
Queen of Katwe opened on September 23 as a limited release in the United States, with an estimated Friday total of $82,000 averaging $1,577 per screen across 52 selected theaters. By the opening weekend, it earned $304,933 averaging $5,864 per screen. It opened on wide release on September 30 to 1,242 screens, and went on to gross $2.5 million in the first week.

=== Critical response ===
Queen of Katwe received positive reviews from critics, with David Oyelowo and Lupita Nyong'o's performances receiving unanimous praise. Review aggregation website Rotten Tomatoes gives the film an approval rating of 94% based on 191 reviews and an average rating of 7.40/10. The website's critical consensus states: "Queen of Katwe is a feel-good movie of uncommon smarts and passion, and Lupita Nyong'o and David Oyelowo's outstanding performances help elevate the film past its cliches." On Metacritic, the film has a normalized rating of 73 out of 100 based on reviews from 40 critics, indicating "generally favorable reviews". Audiences polled by CinemaScore gave the film an average grade of "A+" on an A+ to F scale.

=== Accolades ===
List of awards and nominations
Award	Date of ceremony	Category	Recipient(s)	Result	Ref(s)
African-American Film Critics Association	February 8, 2017	Top 10 Films	Queen of Katwe	10th place	
Africa Movie Academy Award	July 15, 2017	Most Promising Actor	Madina Nalwanga	Won	
Africa Movie Academy Award	July 15, 2017	Best Actor in a Leading Role	David Oyelowo	Nominated	
Africa Movie Academy Award	July 15, 2017	Best Actress in a Supporting Role	Lupita Nyong'o	Nominated	
Africa Movie Academy Award	July 15, 2017	Best Director	Mira Nair	Nominated	
Africa Movie Academy Award	July 15, 2017	Best Film	Queen of Katwe	Nominated	
Africa Movie Academy Award	July 15, 2017	Best Production Design	Queen of Katwe	Nominated	
Africa Movie Academy Award	July 15, 2017	Best Costume Design	Queen of Katwe	Won	
Africa Movie Academy Award	July 15, 2017	Best Visual Effects	Queen of Katwe	Nominated	
Alliance of Women Film Journalists	December 21, 2016	Best Woman Director	Mira Nair	Nominated	
Alliance of Women Film Journalists	December 21, 2016	Best Breakthrough Performance	Madina Nalwanga	Nominated	
Black Reel Awards	February 16, 2017	Outstanding Actress	Madina Nalwanga	Nominated	
Black Reel Awards	February 16, 2017	Outstanding Supporting Actress	Lupita Nyong'o	Nominated	
Black Reel Awards	February 16, 2017	Outstanding Original Song	"Back to Life" – Alicia Keys, Illangelo and Billy Walsh	Nominated	
Critics Choice Awards	December 11, 2016	Best Young Performer	Madina Nalwanga	Nominated	
Evening Standard British Film Awards	December 8, 2016	Best Actor	David Oyelowo (also for A United Kingdom)	Nominated	
Golden Tomato Awards	January 12, 2017	Best Kids/Family Movie 2016	Queen of Katwe	2nd Place	
London Film Critics' Circle	January 22, 2017	British/Irish Actor of the Year	David Oyelowo (also for A United Kingdom)	Nominated	
NAACP Image Awards	February 11, 2017	Outstanding Actress	Madina Nalwanga	Nominated	
NAACP Image Awards	February 11, 2017	Outstanding Supporting Actress	Lupita Nyong'o	Nominated	
NAACP Image Awards	February 11, 2017	Outstanding Supporting Actor	David Oyelowo	Nominated	
NAACP Image Awards	February 11, 2017	Outstanding Film Director	Mira Nair	Nominated	
National Film Awards UK	March 29, 2017	Best Actress	Lupita Nyong'o	Nominated	
National Film Awards UK	March 29, 2017	Best International Film	Queen of Katwe	Nominated	
Toronto International Film Festival	September 18, 2016	People's Choice Award	Mira Nair	3rd Place	
Women Film Critics Circle	December 19, 2016	Best Movie by a Woman	Queen of Katwe	Nominated	
Women Film Critics Circle	December 19, 2016	Best Young Actress	Madina Nalwanga	Nominated	
Women Film Critics Circle	December 19, 2016	Best Female Images in a Movie	Queen of Katwe	Nominated	
Women Film Critics Circle	December 19, 2016	Best Family Film	Queen of Katwe	Won	
Guild of Music Supervisors Awards	February 16, 2017	Best Music Supervision for Films Budgeted Under $25 Million	Linda Cohen and Zohran Kwame Mamdani	Nominated	
