= Wasswa Mark Nyola =

Ugandan chess player (born 2000)

Personal information
- Born: 2000 (age 25–26) Kampala, Uganda

Chess career
- Country: Uganda
- Peak rating: 2263 (May 2026)

Wasswa Mark Nyola (born 2000) is a Ugandan chess player who competes internationally under the Uganda Chess Federation. He holds a FIDE classical rating above 2100 and has represented Uganda in regional and international open competitions.

== Chess career ==
Mark has been active on the international chess circuit, playing in rated events and maintaining an elo rating in all time controls. According to his FIDE profile, he held a classical rating of 2122 as of February 2026, with performances above 1900. He has competed in multinational open tournaments, including the 2025 Kitale Open in Kenya where he scored 5.5 out of 6 rounds to win the event, demonstrating strong performance against competitive fields.

Mark has also participated as part of national selections and qualifiers for major competitions. He was named among prominent Ugandan players contending in national Grand Prix standings and Olympiad qualifying events. In February 2026, he won the 2026 Uganda National Chess Championship in the open category, defeating several titled players to claim his first national title and earn qualification to represent Uganda at the 46th Chess Olympiad. The final standings updated on 22 February 2026. The 46th Chess Olympiad will be held in Samarkand, Uzbekistan, in September 2026 as the host city for the international team chess competition organized by the International Chess Federation (FIDE).

== Education and other achievements ==
Mark is a student at Kampala University Main Campus in Ggaba, where he also represented his institution in national chess championships. At the Rwabushenyi Memorial National Chess Championship in 2025, he finished second, earning a silver medal and recognition for his performance.

== Style of play ==
Mark's recorded games show a diverse opening repertoire and competitive edge in both classical and rapid formats. His participation in international databases indicates usage of standard systems and solid middle-game play.
