= Judith Adong =

Ugandan playwright

- Born: Adong Judith; 1977 (age 48–49); Uganda
- Education: Makerere University
- Occupation: Playwright/film maker
- Writing career
- Genre: Plays

Judith Adonng is a Ugandan playwright and filmmaker.

== Background ==
Adong is a graduate of the arts from Makerere University, where she lectured at the Department of Performing Arts and Film. In July 2011, she was the only African writer among 10 international writers to attend the Royal Court Theatre playwrights' residency, where she developed her play Just Me, You and the Silence, which featured at the New Black Fest in October 2011. She had a public reading for the play at the Old Vic Theatre in London, in 2012. She is also an alumna of the New York acclaimed Robert Redford founded Sundance Institute Theatre Program Lab and Mira Nair's Maisha Film Lab (2008). In 2007, she was the lone Ugandan screenwriter employed on the first ever Kenyan M-Net original television drama series, The Agency. Some radio drama series titles to her name are Rock Point 256 (2005), River Yei Junction (2007) and Take My Hand (2011).

== Writing ==
Adong's writings cut across the dramatic media of theater, film and television and radio. She has also had a number of books for children published by Macmillan and Fountain Publishers.

In April 2011, she was invited by Sundance Institute Theater Program in collaboration was 651 Arts, an arts organization that supports African stories, for a follow-up visit to New York City, where she attended a number of workshops and productions in Broadway as well as Off-Broadway. An excerpt from her play Silent Voices, which is based on interviews with victims of the Northern Uganda conflict depicts, was read at the WYNC National Public Radio in an evening christened "Meet the Artist", in which the audience interacted with Adong about her play. Adong was awarded a Fulbright Scholarship to Film making MFA of Temple University in Philadelphia, where she is currently based. She has also written extensively on social-political and pop culture for television and radio in Uganda, Kenya and Southern Sudan in both English language and her local language –Luo (Acholi dialect).

In 2018, she was the author and director of the play Ga-AD!, which ran from 26 to 30 September at Illinois State University.

== Plays ==
- Just Me, You and the Silence
- Silent Voices
- Rock Point 256 (2005)
- River Yei Junction (2007)
- Take My Hand (2011)
- GA-AD
