= Mira Nair =

Indian American filmmaker (born 1957)

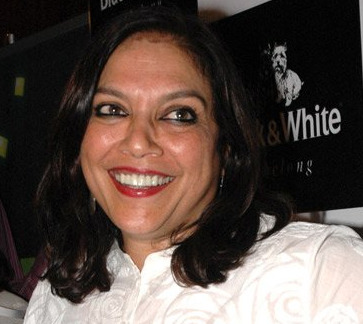
- Nair in 2008
- Born: 15 October 1957 (age 69); Rourkela, Orissa, India
- Education: Loreto Convent, Tara Hall; Harvard University (B.A.)
- Occupation: Filmmaker
- Years active: 1986–present
- Spouses: Mitch Epstein (m. 1981; div. 1989); Mahmood Mamdani (m. 1991)
- Children: Zohran Mamdani
- Relatives: Rama Duwaji (daughter-in-law)

Mira Nair (born 15 October 1957) is an Indian American filmmaker. She has received two prizes from the Cannes Film Festival and four from the Venice Film Festival, as well as nominations for an Academy Award, two BAFTA Awards, a Golden Globe, and two César Awards.

Nair began her career making documentaries, but went on to make feature films. She usually directs independent drama films, which she also produces through her company Mirabai Films, and her films often touch on political themes or controversial topics. She made her feature-length directorial debut with Salaam Bombay! (1988), which received Academy Award, BAFTA Award, and Golden Globe Award nominations. Her next film, Mississippi Masala (1991), was nominated for the Independent Spirit Award for Best Film.

Nair has directed films such as Monsoon Wedding (2001), Vanity Fair (2004), The Namesake (2006), and Queen of Katwe (2016). Monsoon Wedding made her the first female director to win the Golden Lion at the Venice Film Festival, was nominated for the BAFTA Award for Best International Feature Film, and held the record for the highest-grossing Indian film in North America until 2017.

Born and raised in India, Nair moved to the U.S. to attend Harvard University, and was married to photographer Mitch Epstein from the early to late 1980s. She then lived for a few years in Uganda with her second husband, political scientist Mahmood Mamdani, but they later returned to the United States. Their son, Zohran Mamdani, has served as Mayor of New York City since 2026.

== Early life and education ==
Mira Nair was born in Rourkela, in Orissa, India, the daughter of social worker Praveen Nair and Indian Administrative Service officer Amrit Lal Nair. She has two older brothers named Vikram and Gautam. Nair's family are Punjabi Hindus from Delhi. The family name "Nayyar" was changed by her grandfather, although one of her uncles continues to use it.

Nair grew up in a "colonial-style bungalow, with [a] spacious veranda and terracotta-tiled floor''. Her father, Amrit, was a remote character, who was "not much fun", and her parents separated around 1990 after years of tension and fighting. Nair appreciated Amrit's love of Persian poetry and song, but he drove his children hard, insisting that they "spend their time usefully". Mira's father also argued frequently with her brothers, Vikram and Gautam. Nair felt that she was not seen as important as her brothers because she was a girl, and so did not have to deal with the same heavy pressure or constant watching they had to face from their father. She believed being overlooked gave her the quiet space to get on with the things she liked doing without anyone constantly telling her what to do. She looks at that lack of attention as a lucky break that let her follow her own path. Praveen had a strong influence on the young Nair, particularly her independence, confidence, fearlessness, and social awareness. Nair did not directly challenge her father in the home, but in her early documentary films she attacked many of his attitudes, such as the hypocrisy of male ideas about "virtue" in India Cabaret (1985), and the Indian custom by which female fetuses were often aborted, in Children of Desired Sex (1987).

Nair first attended Ispat English Medium School in Rourkela, from ages 7 to 10, between 1964 and 1967. Her family moved to Bhubaneswar, where she lived until age 18. She attended Loreto Convent, Tara Hall in Kaithu, Shimla from 1971 to 1974 where she developed a fondness for the English literature, particularly, Vanity Fair, by William Makepeace Thackeray, which she would adapt into a film one day. In her teens, she taught herself to type and play the sitar; painted; wrote poetry and performed in local theatre, and was also an outstanding student.

She studied at Miranda House- a constituent college for women at Delhi University, where she majored in sociology. (Note: This is reported by this source, but not mentioned in a long 2002 interview.) While at university, she belonged to an amateur drama company in Delhi. There she worked with Indian theatre director Barry John. At university she performed in Equus, Habeas Corpus, and as Cleopatra in Shakespeare's Antony and Cleopatra. She also did political street theatre in Calcutta with the Bengali playwright Badal Sircar. After turning down the offer of a full scholarship to Cambridge University in England, (later saying "I had a chip on my shoulder about the Brits") in 1976, she moved to the US as a nineteen-year-old to attend Harvard University on a scholarship. She enjoyed acting and continued to perform throughout her first year at Harvard. Her friend and future collaborator Sooni Taraporevala was a classmate at Harvard.

Heading to New York City during the summer break of her first year, she worked with American dramatist Joseph Chaikin and met Judith Malina and Julian Beck, who founded The Living Theatre.

Upon returning to Harvard, she took a summer course in photography. She then cross-registered for a film class with Richard Leacock at MIT. This class inspired Nair to focus on documentary filmmaking in the Department of Visual and Environmental Studies at Harvard (now called the Department of Art, Film, and Visual Studies). She graduated in 1979.

== Career ==
Before she became a filmmaker, Nair was interested in acting. While in India, she performed in plays written by Badal Sircar, a Bengali dramatist and theatre director. While she studied film at Harvard, Nair also became involved in the theatre program. She won a Boylston Prize for her performance of Jocasta's speech from Seneca's Oedipus.

In 2002 Nair was interviewed by American theatre critic and biographer John Lahr, in which she shared much about her early life and career to this point.

In a 2004 interview with FF2 Media's Jan Lisa Huttner, Nair commented on her filmmaking process:

It's all in how I do it. Keeping the bums on the seats is very important to me. It requires that ineffable thing called rhythm and balance in movie-making. Foils have to be created, counter-weights. From the intimacy, let's say, of a love scene to the visceral, jugular quality of war. That shift is something in the editing, how one cuts from the intimate to the epic that keeps you there waiting. The energy propels you.

In an interview with Image Journal in 2017, Nair said that she had chosen directing over any other art form because it was collaborative. She said, "That's why I am neither a photographer nor writer, I like to work with people, and my strength, if any, is that. Working with life."

=== Documentaries ===
In her early years, Nair primarily made documentaries in which she explored Indian cultural traditions. For her film thesis at Harvard, between 1978 and 1979, she produced a black-and-white film titled Jama Masjid Street Journal. In the 18-minute film, Nair explored the streets of Old Delhi and had casual conversations with Indian locals, using a Bolex camera. The film's name derives from a Muslim community near the Jama Masjid, a large mosque in Old Delhi.

After Nair graduated and moved to New York, American filmmaker D. A. Pennebaker, a pioneer of the cinéma vérité style of documentary filmmaking, liked Jama Masjid Street Journal and helped Nair secure a grant for her next film. Her second documentary, So Far from India (1982), was a 52-minute film that follows an Indian newspaper dealer living in the subways of New York. His pregnant wife waits for him to return home to India. The protagonist, Ashok, slowly becomes estranged from not only his family, but also his Indian heritage. Nair directed So Far from India as a commentary on the life of an immigrant separated from his home and suffering cultural isolation. The film won Best Documentary at the American Film Festival in Wrocław, Poland and New York's Global Village Film Festival.

Her third documentary, India Cabaret, with cinematography by her husband Mitch Epstein, opened the inaugural Indian International Film Festival, in Hyderabad, in 1985. The film was very well received at the festival. It portrays the exploitation of female strippers in Bombay, and follows a customer who regularly visits a local strip club while his wife stays at home. Nair raised roughly $130,000 for the project. The 59-minute film was shot over a span of two months. India Cabaret was widely criticized, primarily by Indian men, who objected to the portrayal of women working as strippers or those who are forced to marry. In New York some opponents tried to block release of the film on WNET. The film was bought by PBS, but then rejected by Channel 13, the network's New York affiliate. Nair's family, especially her father, also criticized it. He said she should not have positively portrayed these women. Nair created India Cabaret to reveal the prejudice shown towards sex workers. Some feminists criticized her for filming these women through the male gaze, due to the sexual nature of the strip clubs. The film received several awards, including the Blue Ribbon award and two awards for Best Documentary.

Children of a Desired Sex (1987) was the fourth documentary Nair directed. Made for Canadian television, this film explored how amniocentesis was being used to determine the sex of fetuses. Additionally, the premise of the film seeks to bring to light the experiences of women who live in a society where there is a large preference towards giving birth to male children. Despite how controversial this topic may be, Nair highlighted the struggle and the dilemma these women go through.

Living in Cape Town, South Africa, for around three years while her second husband took up a post at the university there, Nair worked on scripts with her friend Sooni Taraporevala, and made a telemovie based on Abraham Verghese's book My Own Country: A Doctor's Story for Showtime. The film tells the story of Dr Verghese's real-life experiences in treating HIV/AIDS patients in East Tennessee. Nair also spent six weeks assisting children who lived in local townships to make films of their lives.

In 2001, with The Laughing Club of India, she explored yoga based on laughter. Its founder, Madan Kararia, spoke of the club's history and the growth of laughing clubs across the country, and subsequently the world. The documentary included testimonials from members of the laughter clubs who described how the practice had improved or changed their lives. Its featured segments included a group of workers in an electrical products factory in Mumbai who took time off to laugh during their coffee break.

=== Feature films ===
In June 1987, with Taraporevala, Nair researched and co-wrote Salaam Bombay!, which turned out to be an enormous and exhausting undertaking. Nair sought out real street children to more authentically portray the lives of children who survived in the streets and were deprived of a true childhood. Mitch Epstein was co-producer and production designer on the film. They struggled to get financing, but eventually Nair "managed to cajole completion cash out of a French company". On 19 May 1988, three days after Nair had finished cutting the film, it had its world première at the closing gala at the 1988 Cannes Film Festival. It earned a 15-minute standing ovation, and won the Caméra d'Or (the first Indian film to do so) and the Prix du public (Audience Prize). It was nominated at the 1989 Academy Awards for Best Foreign Language Film. Although it did not do well at the box office, it won 23 international awards.

Nair and Taraporevala next worked together on the 1991 film Mississippi Masala, which told the story of Ugandan-born Indians (displaced by Idi Amin in 1972) in Mississippi. Their research for the film started in March 1989, and it was their first visit to Africa. Nair met her second husband, Asian Ugandan academic Mahmood Mamdani, when she interviewed him in Nairobi after having read his book From Citizen to Refugee, about the expulsion of Asians. The film centers on a carpet-cleaner business owner (Denzel Washington) who falls in love with the daughter (Sarita Choudhury) of one of his Indian clients. The film revealed the prejudice in the black and Indian communities. Mississippi Masala was heavily inspired by the history of Indian emigrants in Uganda. Nair was inspired by the fact that Ugandan-born Indians often aligned themselves more with white people, especially due to the worse treatment Black Ugandans endured. It was well received by critics, earned a standing ovation at the 1992 Sundance Film Festival, and won three awards at the Venice Film Festival.

Her next feature, The Perez Family (1995), was not a success. The producer said that it had "too much plot", and a critic wrote, "It looks like a musical after all the songs have been cut out." The next one, Kama Sutra: A Tale of Love (1996), which Nair later called "an aberration", also bombed. In that year, the family moved to South Africa for three years, where her career "stagnated".

Monsoon Wedding, written by Sabrina Dhawan, was filmed over only 30 days, using only a small crew, including some of Nair's acquaintances and relatives. Released in 2001, the film told the story of an Indian Punjabi wedding. In the end, the film grossed over $30 million worldwide. The film was awarded the Golden Lion award at the Venice Film Festival, making Nair the first female recipient of the award.

Nair directed the 2002 television film, Hysterical Blindness for HBO. The film is a romance set in 1987 starring Uma Thurman in the lead role. The made-for-TV movie would prove a success for both HBO and Thurman, with the latter receiving a Golden Globe for her acting in the film. This was followed by an adaptation of William Makepeace Thackeray's epic Vanity Fair (2004).

In 2005, Nair was asked to direct Harry Potter and the Order of the Phoenix, but turned it down to work on The Namesake, reportedly after her son Zohran persuaded her that she was the only one who could direct the latter. Based on the book by Pulitzer Prize-winner Jhumpa Lahiri, Sooni Taraporevala's screenplay follows the son of Indian immigrants who wants to fit in with New York City society, but struggles to get away from his family's traditional ways. The film was presented with the Dartmouth Film Award and was also honored with the Pride of India award at the Bollywood Movie Awards. Next she directed the Amelia Earhart biopic Amelia (2009), starring Hilary Swank and Richard Gere. The film predominantly received negative reviews. It was also a box-office bomb, grossing $19.6 million against a budget of $40 million.

In 2012, Nair directed The Reluctant Fundamentalist, a thriller based on the best-selling novel by Mohsin Hamid, starring Riz Ahmed, Kate Hudson, Liev Schreiber, and Kiefer Sutherland. It tells a post-9/11 story about the impact of the terrorist attacks on one Pakistani man and his treatment by Americans in reaction to them. It opened the 2012 Venice Film Festival in Venice, Italy to critical acclaim, and was released worldwide in early 2013. It did not do well at the box office.

Nair's 2016 film Queen of Katwe, a Disney production, starred Lupita Nyong'o and David Oyelowo, and was based on a biography of Ugandan chess prodigy Phiona Mutesi written by American author Tim Crothers. The film earned much acclaim. It had a budget of $15 million and grossed $10.4 million. Nair's son Zohran Mamdani appears as an extra in the film, and one of his songs performed under his rapper pseudonym Young Cardamom, "#1 Spice", also features in the film.

In 2018, Amardeep Singh published a book, with the University Press of Mississippi, about Nair's films, titled, The Films of Mira Nair - Diaspora vérité.

=== Short films ===
Nair's short films include A Fork, a Spoon and a Knight, inspired by the Nelson Mandela quote, "Difficulties break some men but make others."

She contributed a segment to the anthology film 11'09"01 September 11 (2002) in which 11 filmmakers reacted to the terrorist attack on New York on 11 September 2001. Her film dramatises a true story of a New York Pakistani family whose son, Mohammad Salman Hamdani, missing after the event, was suspected by police and reported by the press as being one of the terrorists. When his body was eventually found months later, it turned out that he had rushed to the scene to help people escape the wreckage and was killed himself.

Other titles include How Can It Be? (2008), Migration (2008), New York, I Love You (2009) and her collaboration with among others, Emir Kusturica and Guillermo Arriaga on the anthology film Words with Gods.

=== Other work ===
A long-time activist, Nair set up an annual filmmakers' laboratory, Maisha Film Lab, in Kampala, Uganda. Since 2005, young directors in East Africa have been trained at the nonprofit facility with the motto that "If we don't tell our stories, no one else will". As of 2018 Maisha was building a school with architect Raul Pantaleo, winner of the Aga Khan Award for Architecture, and his company, Studio Tamassociati.

In 1998, Nair used the profits from Salaam Bombay! to create the Salaam Baalak Trust, which works with street children in India. A musical adaptation of Monsoon Wedding, directed by Nair, premiered at the Berkeley Repertory Theatre, running from 5 May to 16 July 2017. As of 2015, she lived in New York City, where she was an adjunct professor in the Film Division of the School of Arts for Columbia University in Manhattan. The university had a collaboration with Nair's Maisha Film Lab and offered opportunities for international students to work together and share their interests in filmmaking.

In July 2020, journalist Ellen Barry announced that her Pulitzer Prize-nominated story "The Jungle Prince of Delhi" about the "royal family of Oudh", published in The New York Times, would be adapted into a web series for Amazon Studios by Nair. In March 2021 it was announced that Nair would direct a ten-episode TV series for Disney+ reimagining the National Treasure series with a new cast.

Mirabai Films is a film production company founded by Mira Nair.

== Personal life ==
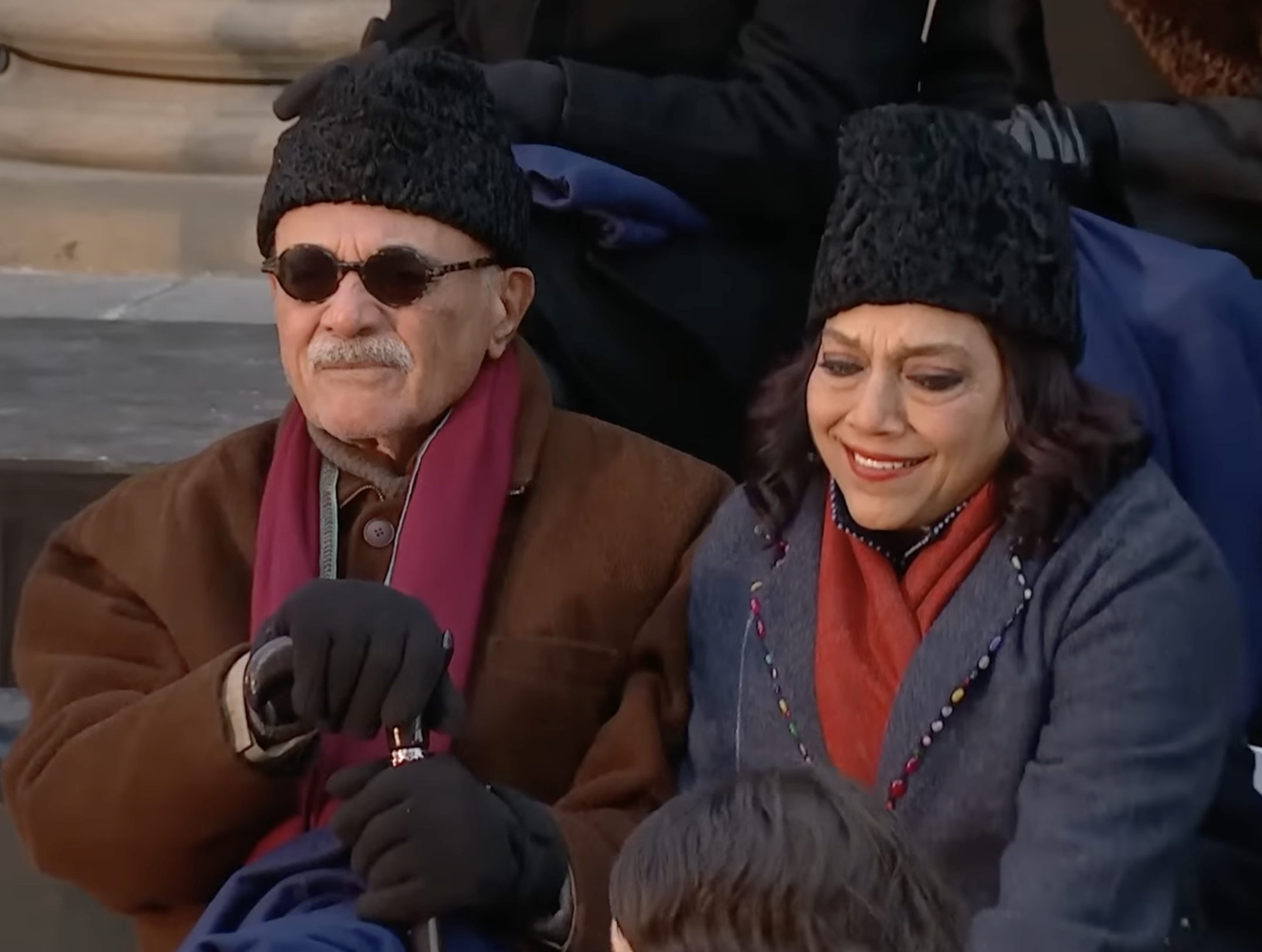
Nair and Mamdani in the crowd of their son Zohran Mamdani's inauguration.

In 1977, Nair met her first husband, photographer Mitch Epstein, when taking photography classes at Harvard University. He was her lecturer, and they married in 1981 in India, in a traditional Punjabi wedding, despite Epstein being "a Jewish boy from Holyoke, Massachusetts." They were together for 12 years, of which they were married for 8. They divorced around 1989.

On 29 March 1989, Nair met her second husband, Indo-Ugandan political scientist Mahmood Mamdani, in Nairobi, Kenya, while doing research for the film Mississippi Masala. She had read his book From Citizen to Refugee, about the expulsion of Asians. Nair moved in with Mamdani on campus at Makerere University, where he was teaching. They married in 1991, and their son, Zohran Mamdani, was born in Kampala, Uganda, in the same year. In 1996, the family moved to Cape Town, South Africa, for Mahmood to take up an appointment as head of the African studies program at the University of Cape Town, where they lived for around three years.

In 2020, her son, Zohran Mamdani, won a seat representing Astoria, Queens, in the New York State Assembly. He became the Mayor of New York City on 1 January 2026.

Nair has been an enthusiastic yoga practitioner. While making a film, she has the cast and crew start the day with a yoga session.

In 2026, her mother died at 94.

== Political views ==
In July 2013, Nair declined an invitation to the Haifa International Film Festival as a "guest of honor" to protest Israel's policies in Palestine. In posts on Twitter, Nair wrote: "I will go to Israel when the walls come down. I will go to Israel when occupation is gone... I will go to Israel when the state does not privilege one religion over another. I will go to Israel when Apartheid is over. I stand w/ Palestine for the Academic and Cultural Boycott of Israel (PACBI) & the larger BDS Mov't." Nair was praised by PACBI, which said her decision to boycott Israel "helps to highlight the struggle against colonialism and apartheid."

== Recognition and awards ==
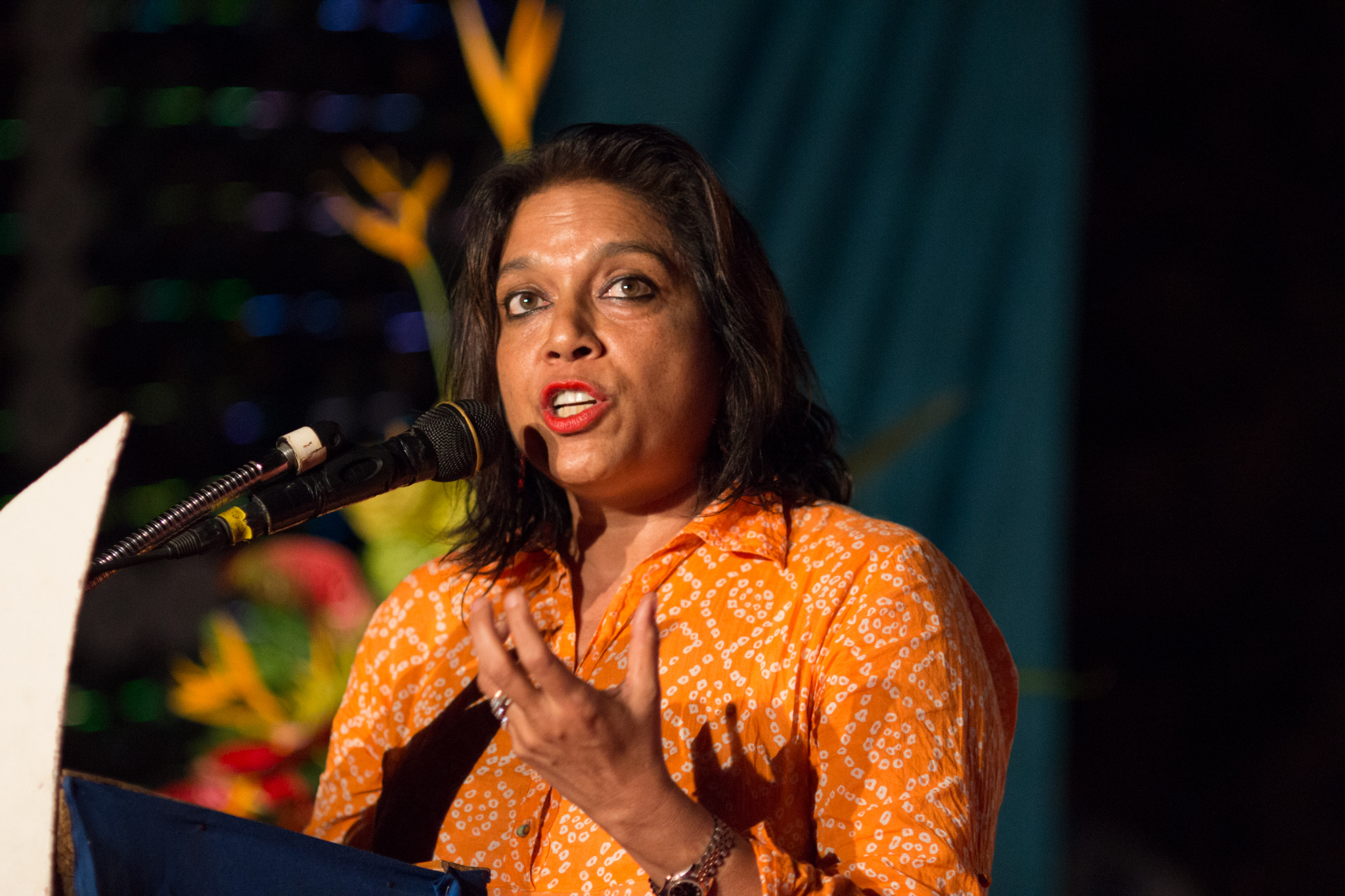
Nair at the 2013 Zanzibar International Film Festival

At the Los Angeles Film Critics Association Awards 1988, Nair was awarded the New Generation Award, a career achievement award, by the Los Angeles Film Critics Association.

In 2012, Nair was awarded India's third highest civilian award, the Padma Bhushan, by then president of India, Pratibha Patil.

=== Films ===
Many of Nair's films have won awards, including:

- 1988: Audience Award, Cannes Film Festival: Salaam Bombay!
- 1988: Golden Camera (Best First Film), Cannes Film Festival: Salaam Bombay!
- 1988: National Film Award for Best Feature Film in Hindi: Salaam Bombay!
- 1988: National Board of Review Award for Top Foreign Films: Salaam Bombay!
- 1988: "Jury Prize", "Most Popular Film", and "Prize of the Ecumenical Jury" at Montreal World Film Festival: Salaam Bombay!
- 1991: Golden Osella (Best Original Screenplay), Venice Film Festival: Mississippi Masala (with Sooni Taraporevala)
- 1991: Critics Special Award, São Paulo International Film Festival: Mississippi Masala
- 2001: Golden Lion (Best Film), Venice Film Festival: Monsoon Wedding
- 2001: Laterna Magica Prize, Venice Film Festival: Monsoon Wedding
- 2003: Harvard Arts Medal
- 2007: "Golden Aphrodite" award, at Love is Folly International Film Festival (Bulgaria), for The Namesake
- 2012: "IFFI Centenary Award" for The Reluctant Fundamentalist

Many of her films have also been nominated for some significant awards; a selection of these follow.

- 1988: Runner-up (2nd to Wings of Desire) Los Angeles Film Critics Association Awards, Best Foreign Film
- 1989: 61st Academy Awards, Academy Award for Best International Feature Film, for Salaam Bombay!
- 1989: César Award for Best Foreign Film (Meilleur film étranger): Salaam Bombay!
- 1989: Golden Globe Award for Best Foreign Language Film: Salaam Bombay!
- 1990: BAFTA Award for Best Film Not in the English Language: Salaam Bombay!
- 1991: Golden Lion (Best Film), Venice Film Festival: Mississippi Masala
- 1993: Independent Spirit Award for Best Feature: Mississippi Masala
- 1996: Golden Seashell, San Sebastián International Film Festival: Kama Sutra: A Tale of Love
- 2001: Golden Globe Award for Best Foreign Language Film: Monsoon Wedding
- 2002: BAFTA Award for Best Film Not in the English Language: Monsoon Wedding
- 2003: Golden Star, International Film Festival of Marrakech: Hysterical Blindness
- 2004: Golden Lion (Best Film), Venice Film Festival: Vanity Fair
- 2007: Gotham Award for Best Film: The Namesake

== Filmography ==
=== Feature fiction films ===
Year	Title	Notes
1988	Salaam Bombay!	Nominated - Academy Award for Best Foreign Language Film; Nominated - BAFTA Award for Best Film Not in the English Language; Nominated - Golden Globe Award for Best Foreign Language Film; Nominated - Filmfare Award for Best Director
1991	Mississippi Masala	Nominated - Independent Spirit Award for Best Film
1995	The Perez Family	
1996	Kama Sutra: A Tale of Love	
1998	My Own Country	Made for television (Showtime)
2001	Monsoon Wedding	Winner - Golden Lion; Nominated - BAFTA Award for Best Film Not in the English Language; Nominated - Golden Globe Award for Best Foreign Language Film
2002	Hysterical Blindness	Made for television (HBO)
2004	Vanity Fair	
2006	The Namesake	
2009	Amelia	
2012	The Reluctant Fundamentalist	won- Munich International Film Festival
2016	Queen of Katwe	won- Africa Movie Academy Awards
2027	Amri	Post-production

=== Documentary films ===
Year	Title	Notes (Awards)
1979	Jama Street Masjid Journal	Film thesis at Harvard
1982	So Far From India	Best Documentary at American Film Festival Best Documentary at New York's Global Village Film Festival
1984	India Cabaret	Best Documentary at New York's Global Village Film Festival Awarded the Blue Ribbon
1987	Children of a Desired Sex	
2001	The Laughing Club of India	

=== Short films ===
Year	Title	Notes
1993	The Day the Mercedes Became a Hat	
2002	India	Segment of 11'9"01 September 11
2007	Migration..	Segment of AIDS Jaago
2008	Kosher Vegetarian	Segment of New York, I Love You
2008	How can it be?	Segment of 8
2014	God Room	Segment of Words with Gods

=== Television series ===
Year	Title	Notes
2020	A Suitable Boy	5 episodes
2022	National Treasure: Edge of History	Episode "I'm a Ghost"

== See also ==
- Indians in the New York metropolitan area
