= Christine Namaganda =

Ugandan chess player (born 1986)

Personal information
- Born: January 11, 1986 (age 40)

Chess career
- Country: Uganda
- Title: Woman FIDE Master (2015)
- Peak rating: 1761 (March 2024)

Christine Namaganda (born January 11, 1986) is a Ugandan chess player. She attained Woman Fide Master status in 2015.

== Education ==
Namaganda studied for a master's degree at Makerere University.

== Chess career ==
Namaganda attained fide Arbiter trainer status in 2016. She also travelled to Ivory Coast to train the youth how to play chess. She has represented Uganda in various international tournaments such as CommonWealth games in India, 43rd Batumi Olympiad. She has also won several local women's tournaments, over seven times. She also emerged victor of the women's day tournament, Queens of Chess.

In 2016 she rejected the Uganda Sports Press Association identification of Joyce Kabengano as the Best Female Chess Player of the Year, claiming she ranked higher.

== See also ==
- Uganda Chess Federation
- Woman Fide Master
- International Federation of Chess
- Ivy Claire Amoko
- Gloria Nansubuga
