= David Cecil (producer) =

British theatre producer

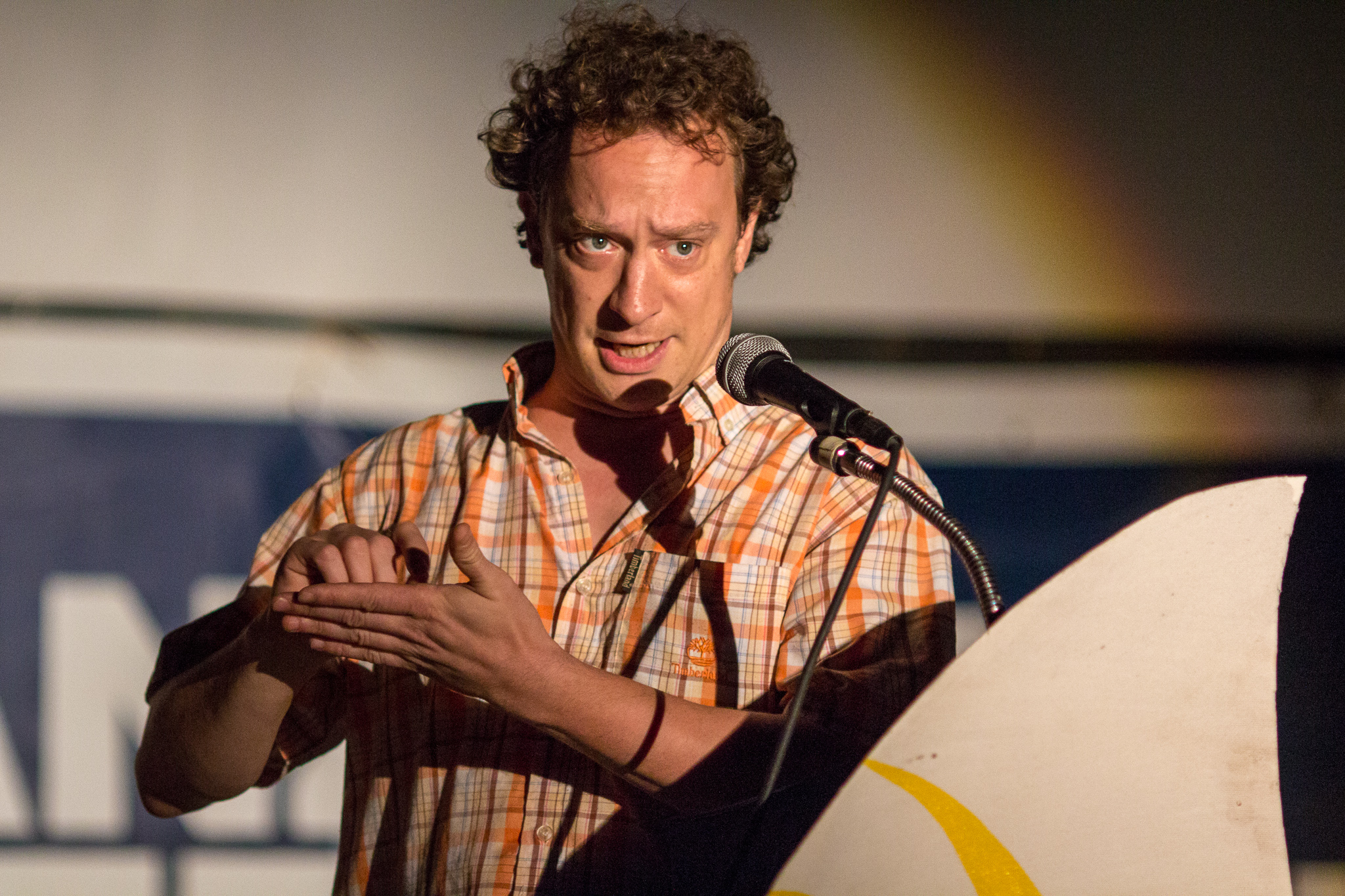
Cecil at Zanzibar International Film Festival

David Cecil is a British theatre producer. He is a filmmaker, Deejay and occasionally works in theaters. He was arrested in Uganda over a play which references homosexuality on 17 September 2012.

== Career ==
He worked in a Higher education and media in Uganda since 2007. He also worked at Cavendish University, Kampala from 2008 and Kampala Film School from 2010. He then established Tilapia Cultural Centre in Bunga, Kampala in 2010, a venue hosting live music and performing arts.

After, he was deported from Uganda in 2013 over "media crimes", he set up an events company in Nairobi, Kenya and conducted research in the media sectors of Rwanda and Tanzania. He later returned in Uganda in 2015, he was one of the founders of Nyege Nyege International Music Festival. In 2017, he established the East African Records.

== Arrest ==
Cecil produced The River and the Mountain, written by Beau Hopkins, a British writer in Kampala and directed by Angela Emurwon. The cast was all-Ugandan. The dramatic comedy was programmed at the National Theatre at the Uganda National Cultural Centre but had to relocate after the Ugandan Media Council on 16 August 2012 provisory banned a performance in public.

The Ugandan minister of ethics said the play “justified the promotion of homosexuality in Uganda," and added, "We will put pressure on anyone who says this abomination is acceptable.” Cecil was placed in a prison near Kampala on 15 and 16 September. A Ugandan court released him on bail on 17 September after charging him in connection with the staging of the play, charges which carried up to a potential two-year jail sentence.

A petition calling for the charges against Cecil to be dropped, organized by Index on Censorship and David Lan, was signed by more than 2500 people, including Mike Leigh, Stephen Fry, Sandi Toksvig and Simon Callow.

In January 2013, a magistrate dismissed all charges against Cecil. In February 2013, Cecil was again detained by the police as a person described by the Ministry of Ethics as undesirable. He was then deported back to the United Kingdom. The deportation was done very quickly and there was concern that proper legal procedure was not in place before the deportation. Chris Ward, a spokesman for the British High Commission in Uganda, said there was "concern that [Cecil] was deported without a chance to challenge the deportation". He added that British officials would be "looking at ways in which we can discuss due process with the Ugandan authorities".

== See also ==
- Uganda Anti-Homosexuality Bill
- Politics of Uganda
- Law enforcement in Uganda
- Human rights in Uganda
