= Madina Nalwanga =

Ugandan actress (born 2002)

- Born: 15 March 2002 (age 24); Kampala, Uganda
- Other name: Queen
- Education: Grand Valley State University
- Occupation: Actress
- Years active: 2016–present
- Awards: Most Promising Actor award at 2017 Africa Movie Academy Awards

Madina Nalwanga (born 15 March 2002) is a Ugandan actress known for her lead role as Phiona Mutesi in Queen of Katwe (2016). The film depicts the life of Mutesi, a Ugandan girl living in a slum in Katwe who learns to play chess and becomes a Woman Candidate Master. This role earned her the Most Promising Actor award at 2017 Africa Movie Academy Awards in Lagos, Nigeria. She also won an NAACP Image Award, a Women Film Critics Circle Award, and was nominated for a Critic's Choice Award.

== Biography ==
Madina was born in the poor Katwe neighborhood in Kampala, Uganda, and spent her childhood selling corn on the streets. Nalwanga was discovered by a casting director at a community dance class in the Kabalagala neighborhood of Kampala, Uganda, a slum known for prostitution.

During the filming of Queen of Katwe, David Oyelowo took Nalwanga to see Jurassic World with other kids from the set, and discovered she'd never seen a movie when she asked, "Is that what we are doing?" When she watched Queen of Katwe, it was only the second time she'd been inside a movie theater. She has said her young life closely mirrored that of her character Phiona in Queen of Katwe. At 17 years old, Forbes named her the youngest person on their 2018 "30 Under 30" list. According to a University of Oxford study from their department of Economics, students in Uganda who watched Queen of Katwe before taking their national exams received better grades than those who didn't.
