= Uganda Chess Federation =

Governing body for chess in Uganda

- Abbreviation: UCF
- Formation: 1972; 54 years ago
- Headquarters: Kampala, Uganda
- Region served: Uganda
- President: Andrew Bakiza
- Deputy President: Allan Benjamin Mande
- General Secretary: Walter Okas
- Treasurer: David Muwanguzi
- Staff: 8

The Uganda Chess Federation (UCF) is the governing body of chess competition in Uganda and a member of FIDE, the international chess federation. It administers the official national chess rating system which awards both numeric ratings and titles of distinction. The UCF was founded in 1972, became affiliated with the National Council of Sports in 1973, and in 1978 was affiliated with FIDE, the first Federation in East Africa to achieve this.

== History ==
The UCF was formerly known as the Chess Association of Uganda, which was formed in 1972 by a group of Ugandan physicians in the wake of excitement over the defeat of Boris Spassky by Bobby Fischer at that year's World Chess Championship. Chess was not well known and rarely played in the country prior to the early 1970s. After the organization's formation, the initial venue for matches was commonly Mulago Hospital or Makarere University, both located in Uganda's capital city of Kampala. The name change to Uganda Chess Federation took place after FIDE's involvement in 1976. In the late 1970s the UCF began publishing Checkmate, a pamphlet that helped foster wider interest in the sport.

As of 2014, the UCF's president was Vianney Luggya.

== See also ==
- Fédération Internationale des Échecs (FIDE)
- International Correspondence Chess Federation (ICCF)
- Phiona Mutesi
