= Tim Crothers =

American author

Tim Crothers is an American author. He attended the University of North Carolina at Chapel Hill, writing for the school paper, The Daily Tar Heel. He was the former senior writer at Sports Illustrated. He has authored The Queen of Katwe, a book about the Ugandan junior woman chess master Phiona Mutesi. This book was selected by Dave Eggers for Best American Nonrequired Reading and favorably reviewed by The Washington Post.

He also co-authored Hard Work: A Life On and Off the Court, which rose to #15 on The New York Times Best Seller list. This book is a biography of Roy Williams (who also co-authored the book). Williams was the North Carolina Tar Heels basketball coach and became the highest winning percentage among all active college coaches.
