= Ivy Claire Amoko =

Ugandan chess player and lawyer (born 1987)

Personal information
- Born: 3 May 1987 (age 39) Kampala, Uganda

Chess career
- Country: Uganda
- Title: Woman FIDE Master (2014)
- Peak rating: 1872 (March 2024)

Ivy Claire Amoko is a Ugandan chess player. In 2014, she became the first woman Fide Master in East Africa.

== Early life ==
Amoko was born to Stella Arach-Amoko and Idule Amoko. She attended Shimoni Demonstration School for primary and later St Joseph’s Nsambya (O-level) and Nabisunsa Girls (A-level).

== Chess career ==
Amoko started playing chess in 2007.

She was a gold medal winner for chess in the Inter-University Games in 2007 and 2008, playing for Makerere University.

In 2012, Amoko and Phiona Mutesi were awarded the title of Woman Candidate Master after scoring the required 50% from nine games at the 40th Chess Olympiad in Istanbul, Turkey. This made them the first titled female players in Ugandan chess history.

Amoko won on her debut in Rwabushenyi Memorial Chess tournament in the Females category in 2014, after winning all eight of her tournament games, capturing the title from Phiona Mutesi.

At the close of the 41st Chess Olympiad in Tromsø in 2014, Amoko was elevated to Woman Fide Master; she was the first woman to achieve this title in East Africa.

She currently plays with the Kireka Panthers Chess Club, in the Uganda Chess League.
