= Phiona Mutesi =

Ugandan chess player (born 1996)

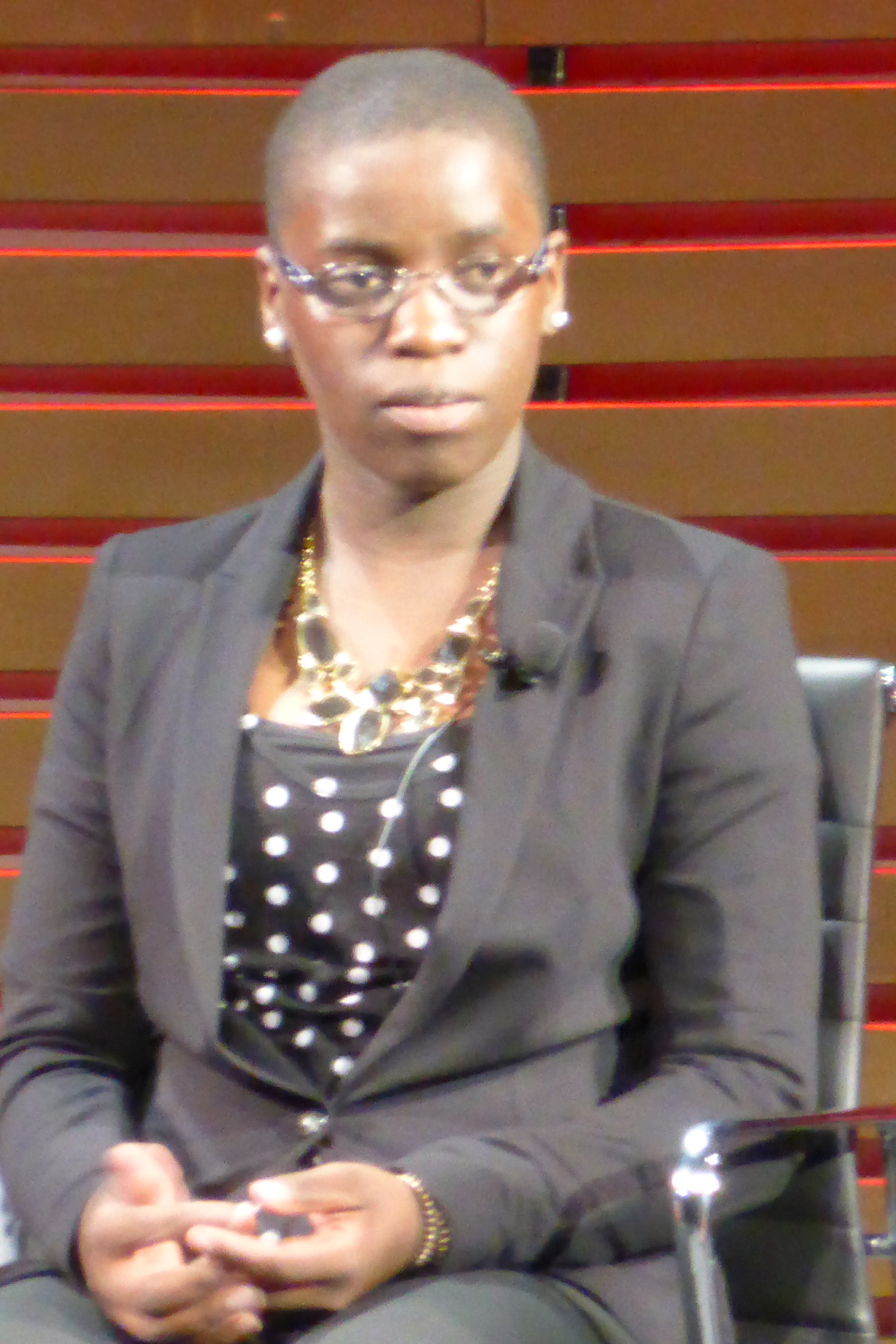
- Mutesi at the Women in the World Conference 2013

Personal information
- Born: 28 March 1996 (age 30) Kampala, Uganda

Chess career
- Country: Uganda
- Title: Woman Candidate Master (2012)
- Peak rating: 1774 (March 2024)

Phiona Mutesi (born 28 March 1996) is a Ugandan chess player. She has represented Uganda at four Women's Chess Olympiads, and is one of the first titled female players in Ugandan chess history. Mutesi is the subject of a 2012 book and a 2016 film called Queen of Katwe.

== Background ==
Mutesi was born and grew up in the neighbourhood of Katwe, the largest of Kampala's eight slums. When she was roughly three years old, her father died of AIDS. Her older sister, Julia, subsequently died of unknown causes. At age nine, Mutesi dropped out of school because her family could no longer afford to send her.

Mutesi sold maize in a street market. One day she followed her brother and discovered a project run by Sports Outreach Institute, a Christian-led sports mission. In this after-school program run by Robert Katende, Mutesi began playing chess.

During a trip to the US, Mutesi visited Northwest University in Kirkland, Washington. She was offered a scholarship and began attending Northwest University in 2017. She plans to major in sociology. After college, Mutesi said she wants to "come back home and serve my community," and work with children who live in the slums of Uganda.

As of 2019, Mutesi spent less time on chess, and focused on her studies and work as a motivational speaker.

Mutesi graduated from Northwest University in May 2021 with a Bachelor of Arts in Business Administration and Management. From July 2021 to August 2023, she worked as a Business Strategy Analyst for Microsoft, before becoming a Business Operations Analyst for Deloitte in Canada.

== Chess career ==
In 2010, Mutesi played six rounds on board two and one round on board one for Uganda at the women's event of the 39th Chess Olympiad, held in Khanty-Mansiysk, Russia. She scored one-and-a-half points from the seven games she played. At this event, she attracted the attention of journalist Tim Crothers, who wrote a substantial piece on her for ESPN The Magazine.

Commenting on one of her games from the 2010 Olympiad, British chess journalist John Saunders wrote that "Phiona's present playing standard is that of a modest but competent club player but, placed in the context of her environmental and educational deprivation, her achievement in reaching such a level has been awe-inspiring."

As of 2012, she was a three-time winner of the Women's Junior Chess Championship of Uganda.

In 2012, Mutesi and Ivy Amoko were awarded the title of Woman Candidate Master after scoring the required 50% from nine games at the 40th Chess Olympiad in Istanbul, Turkey. This made them the first titled female players in Ugandan chess history. The same year Mutesi became the first female player to win the open category of the National Junior Chess Championship in Uganda.

In 2013, she again played in the National Junior Chess Championship in Uganda and reached the finals against Lutaaya Shafiq of Makerere University. She won the under-20 girls category but not the open category.

Mutesi represented Uganda at the 2014 41st Chess Olympiad and the 2016 42nd Chess Olympiad.

She joined Northwest University's chess team in competing at the Pan American Intercollegiate Team Chess Championship, held in Columbus, Ohio, in December 2017. The team won the title of "Top Small College" for Northwest University, taking it from the title holders of four consecutive years, Oberlin College. Mutesi won three matches and drew one, playing on Board 2.

== Media ==
In 2010, Silent Images made a short documentary film about her. Sports Outreach used this documentary to interest The Walt Disney Company in making a film about Mutesi's story, which came out in 2016.

In 2012, a book was published about Mutesi titled The Queen of Katwe: A Story of Life, Chess, and One Extraordinary Girl's Dream of Becoming a Grandmaster and authored by Tim Crothers.

Walt Disney Pictures optioned the rights to the book and began work on the film in 2012. That 2016 film, Queen of Katwe, stars Lupita Nyong'o and David Oyelowo. Mutesi is portrayed by Madina Nalwanga. Mutesi attended premieres of the film in Toronto, Canada (10 September), Hollywood, California (20 September), and Kampala, Uganda (1 October). The royalties from the book have provided Mutesi and her family much more financial security than they have ever enjoyed. Mutesi said, "I think the film was a 90 per cent portrayal of me, although I did not want some scenes of dancing because I don't like dancing." As of 2019 Mutesi had apparently not received royalties from the Disney film.
