= Joel Okuyo Atiku =

Ugandan actor, Director and interdisciplinary artist (born 1983)

Okuyo Joel Atiku Prynce
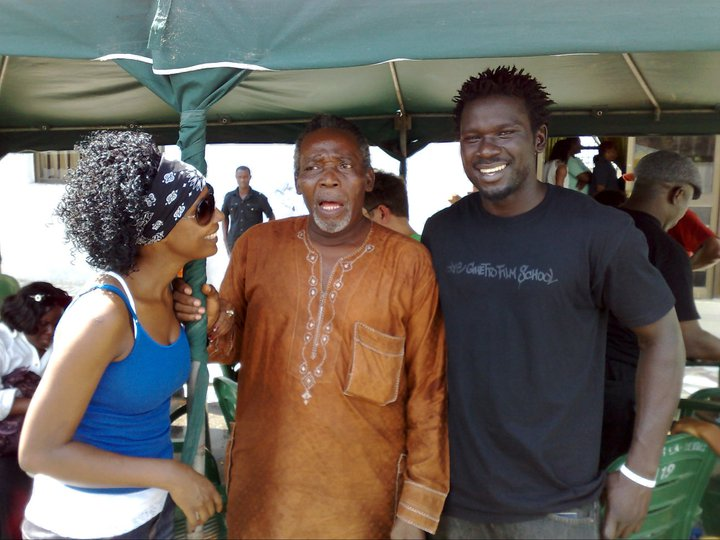
- Prynce (right) and Agnes Kebirungi (left) from Battle of the Souls with Olu Jacobs (centre) in Nigeria
- Born: Joel Okuyo Atiku Prynce; 4 December 1983 (age 42); Arua, Uganda
- Education: Makerere University
- Occupations: Actor, model, photographer and lecturer
- Partner: Cindy Sanyu

Joel Okuyo Atiku Prynce (born 4 December 1983) is a Ugandan actor, model, photographer and lecturer at Uganda Christian University where he graduated with a Bachelor of Social Work and Social Administration (BSWSA) plus Makerere University, the Best Two Campuses in Uganda. His film acting breakthrough came when he was cast as the Devil's reincarnation in Ugandan director Matt Bish's 2007 Film Battle of the Souls, a popular Ugawood Movie. It was based on the real-life story of the director's brother, KFM Radio Presenter Roger Mugisha. Prynce is also the President of his own company The Lhynnq-X, Inc. Born in Arua on 4 December 1983 to a Lugbara couple, the late Lt.Colonel Gabriel Francis Atiku and Yema Drakuru Atiku, his debut villain role won him over five international accolades including Best Supporting Actor at the Balafon Film Festival in Bari, Italy (2008) and 2009's Best Actor in Supporting Role at the Africa Movie Academy Awards (AMAA) in Lagos, Nigeria. Other awards include Best Actor at both Ubuntu Village, Colorado (USA) in 2010 and the 2011 Zanzibar International Film Festival [ZIFF] in Tanzania. Ugandan newspaper The Observer labelled Okuyo Africa's Brad Pitt.

== Career ==
His mother recalls that Joel started acting by copying his father's walking style at age 4 plus things he watched on TV or saw at school. By Primary Five, he had won his first award and kept acting throughout his school experience. Okuyo also joined MITG (Music & Instrumental Training Group), an Arua-based Drama Group that championed European Union AIDS Intervention Programmes in West Nile. Joel has acted in many films and plays, both local and international plus worked with world class directors such as Michael Landon, Jr., Gabriel Range, Adrian McFarlane, Ruman Kudwai, Yuval Shefferman and fellow countryman Matt Bish (Full name: Matthew Bishanga). Joel played roles in feature films like State Research Bureau (S.R.B.) plus TV Series like Locked Up Abroad, Raised Wild and Lost in Africa.

The Maisha Film Lab short films he acted in after training at Mira Nair's annual film academy include On Time (2008) directed by Patricia Olwoch, Looserpool, Live Joseph and Estranged (where he played a lead role) directed by Sandra Kosse.

Other shorts he has featured in include Fruits of Love, Journey to Jamaa as Lucky, Haunted Souls and A Good Catholic Girl directed by Matt Bish (which was included in Africa First: Volume Two, an anthology of five short films from new African filmmakers).

He was the face of BlackBerry Curve (MTN Uganda) in 2007. Then in 2009, he became a runway model at V.I.P fashion night in Lagos, Nigeria. He has worked as a model at Vanity Models (Verona, Italy) and Uganda's Gorgeous Fashions. Joel's face also appears in SAB Miller Television, Billboard & Print Media advertisements for beer brands such as Stone Lager in Ghana, Safari Lager in Tanzania and Nile Special Lager in his home country, all directed by Mark Lawrie for The Videolounge. Other TV commercials include Warid Telecom (Congo Brazzaville) directed by Steve Jean; Warid (Uganda), Stanbic Bank and Johns Hopkins University directed by Carolyn Kamya plus Bank of Uganda directed by Matt Bish.

He was the first male to appear in the African Woman Magazine's 'All Lights On' Segment in 2010.

Joel appeared in the promo for Love Makanika (TV series), one of the first programmes aired on Pearl Magic that went digital on GOtv beginning Monday 1 October 2018.

== Radio ==
Okuyo has lent his talent as a supporting voice to radio productions like Mako Meere directed by Patricia Olwoch (for Mifumi) and Rock Point by Albert Mwesige (Audio Central). He once worked for Bob FM also.

== Theatre ==
He has acted in theatre performances like Just You Me & the Silence directed by Judith Adong in conjunction with Alfajiri Productions. In 2017, he took part as Lokil in preparing a stage play entitled Strings that will first be performed on 22 November.

== Controversial performance ==
Okuyo received negative criticism, even from friends for acting in The River and the Mountain, a play whose parts Uganda's Media Council ruled "implicitly promote homosexual acts". Written by Oxford-educated poet Beau Hopkins in collaboration with David Cecil, a British producer and the manager of Tilapia (Cultural Centre where the play ran for a week until 23 August 2012), it was deemed contrary to the laws, cultural norms and values of Uganda hence Cecil's arrest on 6 September 2012. In the play, Okuyo plays Samson, a homosexual factory owner killed by his own workers after they are incited by fiercely conservative pastors. Okuyo was accused of "being funded by gay lobby groups", but replied, "I am not into gay advocacy. Although with this play, we do want to make people understand that we are all human. We should not judge, segregate, harm or kill others."

== Personal interests ==
Joel enjoys drawing (Art), fashion, film acting, modelling, meeting new friends, humanitarianism, playing basketball, guitar, swimming, fishing, reading, cooking, writing and travelling. In March 2020, he got engaged to dancehall artiste Cindy Sanyu with whom he had worked on two films November Tear and Bella.

== Filmography ==
Music videos

Okuyo features in Priscilla Kalibala's "Boo", the original soundtrack to Battle of the Souls plus "Free People" written and performed by Terry De Vos as the original soundtrack to State Research Bureau. He also features in Winnie Nwagi's "Kibulamu" music video as her lover. The singer tells him that their relationship lacks certain romantic things, so they need to go their separate ways. Winnie even packs her bag to leave. In the end, they reconcile but while sitting at a table, two packs of condoms fall from Okuyo's coat and the video fades. He also features in "Ready To Leave" by Abasa. Prynce through his production company has made music videos for artistes like Cindy including "Whine Yo Waist", "Sunset" and "Kiki", etc.

Films

Year	Title	Role	Production company	Director
2007	Battle of the Souls	The Devil	Bish Films	Matt Bish
2008	On Time	Otim	Maisha Film Lab	Patricia Olwoch
2009	Hearts in Pieces	Supporting actor	Trends Studios	Mariam Ndagire
2010	I am Slave	Shopkeeper	Altered Image	Gabriel Range
2010	Imani	Featured	iVAD Production	Carolyn Kamya
2010	A Good Catholic Girl	Lead		Matt Bish
2011	State Research Bureau	(Prisoner) James	Bish Films	Matt Bish
2013	Imbabazi (The Pardon)	Manzi	Karekezi Films	Joel Karekezi
2013	Wekeza Inalipa	Featured	Jasons Production	Baba Hadji
2014	Situka	Alvin	Fun Factory	Kwezi Kaganda
2014	In Reality	Doctor	Wristhouse	Douglas Benda Kasule
2015	King of Darkness	Lead: Detective Lewis	Machine Gun Preacher Productions	
2015	The Black Belgian	Supporting actor		Jean Luc Habyarimana
2016	Jinxed	Supporting actor	Kampala Film School, Maisha Film Lab	Gary Mugisha
2016	New Intentions	Counsel Douglas	Kihiray Pictures	Kihire Kennedy
2016	Mr. Ability	DOP	Prynce Pictures	Joel Okuyo Atiku
2016	Rain	DJ Daddy		Daniel Mugerwa
2016	Queen of Katwe	Ggaba Merchant	Walt Disney Pictures, ESPN Films	Mira Nair
2017	Black and White	Lead	Stone Age Productions	
2017	Kony: Order from Above	Kony, Omona, first AD	Atonga Media/Entertainment & Quad-A Records	T. Steve Ayeny
2017	Bella	Supporting actor, DOP	Bish Films	Matt Bish
2017	Kyenvu	MAN		Kemiyondo Coutinho
2017	The Bad Mexican	Moses	Loukout Films	Loukman Ali
2018	The Mercy of the Jungle	Kibindankoyi	Imbabazi Productions	Joel Karekezi
2019	November Tear	Mwene	Jephin/ Prynce Pictures	Richard Nondo
2019	Splash		Prynce Pictures	Joel Okuyo Atiku
2022	Pieces of Me	Naava's father	Savannah Moon/ Maisha Magic Movies	Nicholas Nsubuga
2022	The Test	Tito	Limit Production	Richard Mulindwa
2022	Love is Blind (short film)			

Television

Year	Title	Role	Broadcaster	Director
2008	Locked Up Abroad	Supporting actor	National Geographic	Paul Berczeller
2009	Lost in Africa	Supporting actor	Kuperman TV	Yuval Shefferman
2012	Raised Wild	Featured	Discovery World	Adrian McFarlane
2013	Kona	Guest	Multichoice	Wanjiru Kairu, Natasha Likimani, Damaris Irungu
2017	Reflections (series)	Lead	Savannah Moon	Nana Kagga
2017	Brothers (series)	Lead: Keith, Producer, DOP	Jephin Films	
2017	Taste of Times, Season 2	Executive Producer, DOP	Jephin Films	
2021	Okalyadda		Top TV (Premiered 1 March 2021)	
2021	What If (TV Series)	William	NTV (Premiered 1 August 2024)	Richard Mulindwa
