= Africa Movie Academy Award for Best Documentary =

Film award category

The Africa Movie Academy Award for Best Documentary is an annual merit by the Africa Film Academy to reward the best short and feature documentaries for the year. It has been merged and renamed severally since it was first awarded in 2006 as Best Documentary.

Best Documentary
Year	Name of Category	Documentary	Recipient	Result
2006	Best Documentary	Tasuma		Won
2006	Best Documentary	Ending a Cane		Nominated
2006	Best Documentary	House of Love		Nominated
2006	Best Documentary	Nollywood the Young side of Film		Nominated
2006	Best Documentary	Salma Yoba		Nominated
2007	Best Documentary Feature	Conversations on a Sunday Afternoon		Won
2007	Best Documentary Feature	Covenant Church		Nominated
2007	Best Documentary Feature	Bitter Water Mara		Nominated
2008	Best Feature Documentary	Do You Believe in Magic	Moondog Films	Won
2008	Best Feature Documentary	Dun-dun (the talking drum)	Ibikansale D. Kayode	Nominated
2008	Best Feature Documentary	Bridging the Gap	Myanda Production	Nominated
2008	Best Feature Documentary	A Rare Gem	Packnet Productions	Nominated
2008	Best Feature Documentary	Families under Attack	Myandu Films	Nominated
2008	Best Short Documentary	Not My Daughter		Won
2008	Best Short Documentary	Operation Smile		Nominated
2008	Best Short Documentary	Healthy Children, Wealthy Nation		Nominated
2009	Best Feature Documentary	For the Best and for the Onion and Malcolm’s Echo		Won
2009	Best Feature Documentary	Private Files		Nominated
2009	Best Feature Documentary	Shit on the Rock		Nominated
2009	Best Feature Documentary	Grandma’s not Home		Nominated
2009	Best Short Documentary	Coming of Age		Won
2009	Best Short Documentary	Per Second Killer		Nominated
2009	Best Short Documentary	Santos the Survivor		Nominated
2009	Best Short Documentary	Lost in the South		Nominated
2009	Best Short Documentary	Congo my Foot		Nominated
2010	Best Documentary	Bariga Boys		Won
2010	Best Documentary	Mwamba Ngoma	Jordan Riber	Nominated
2010	Best Documentary	Peace Wanted Alive		Nominated
2010	Best Documentary	En quête d’identité		Nominated
2010	Best Documentary	Innovating for Africa		Nominated
2011	Best Documentary (Feature)	Kondi Et Le Jeudi National	Ariana Astrid Atodji	Won
2011	Best Documentary (Feature)	Headlines In History	Zobby Bresson	Nominated
2011	Best Documentary (Feature)	Co-Exist	Adam Mazo	Nominated
2011	Best Documentary (Feature)	State Of Mind	Djo Tunda Wa Munga	Nominated
2011	Best Documentary (Feature)	Naija Diamonds	Nfrom Leonard	Nominated
2011	Best Short Documentary	After The Mine	Diendo Hamadi & Dinta Wa Lusula	Won
2011	Best Short Documentary	Symphony Kinshasa	Diendo Hamadi & Dinta Wa Lusula	Nominated
2011	Best Short Documentary	Naija Diamond (Feature On Dr. Rahmat Mohammed)	Nform Leonard	Nominated
2011	Best Short Documentary	Stepping Into The Unknown	Rowena Aldous & Jill Hanas-Hancock	Nominated
2011	Best Short Documentary	Yeabu’s Homecoming	Jenny Chu	Nominated
2012	Best Documentary	An African Election		Won
2012	Best Documentary	Beyond The Deadly Pit		Nominated
2012	Best Documentary	Awa Ogbe: An African Adventure		Nominated
2012	Best Documentary	Dear Mandela		Nominated
2012	Best Documentary	White & Black; Crime And Colour		Nominated
2012	Best Documentary	The Niger Delta Struggle		Nominated
2012	Best Documentary	There Is Nothing Wrong With My Uncle		Nominated
2012	Best Documentary	How Much Is Too Much		Nominated
2013	Best Documentary	Fuelling Poverty		Won
2013	Best Documentary	Gun To Tape		Nominated
2013	Best Documentary	Swimming The Zambezi		Nominated
2013	Best Documentary	Give Me Back My Home		Nominated
2013	Best Documentary	The African Cypher Fly On The Wall		Nominated
2014	Best Documentary	Hamu Beya - The Sand Fishers and Portrait of a Lone Farmer		Won
2014	Best Documentary	Kushaya Ingagasi		Nominated
2014	Best Documentary	Daughters of the Niger Delta		Nominated
2014	Best Documentary	Sincerely Ethiopia		Nominated
