= 5th Africa Movie Academy Awards =

2009 film awards ceremony

- Date: Saturday, 4 April 2009
- Site: Gloryland Cultural Center; Yenagoa, Bayelsa State, Nigeria
- Hosted by: Kate Henshaw-Nuttal; Julius Agwu
- Organized by: Africa Film Academy

Highlights
- Best Picture: From a Whisper
- Most awards: From a Whisper (5)
- Most nominations: From a Whisper (12)

The 5th Africa Movie Academy Awards ceremony was held on 4 April 2009, at the Gloryland Cultural Center in Yenagoa, Bayelsa State, Nigeria, to honour the best African films of 2008. It was broadcast live on Nigerian national television. Africa Movie Academy Award winner Kate Henshaw-Nuttal and Nigerian stand-up comedian Julius Agwu hosted the ceremony. Numerous celebrities graced the event, including Timipre Sylva (the Governor of Bayelsa State) and Nollywood actresses and actors. Special guests were Academy Award winner Forest Whitaker and Hollywood actor Danny Glover.

The nominees were announced on 3 March 2009, during the 21st Pan African Film and Television Festival of Ouagadougou (FESPACO) by AMAA CEO Peace Anyiam-Osigwe. Approximately 403 entries from 54 African countries participated in the bid for an award.

With a total of twelve nominations, the Kenyan film From a Whisper led the nomination count, while Uganda's Battle of the Souls and South Africa's Gugu and Andile followed with ten nominations each. Nigeria's Arugba received nine nominations, Egypt's Seventh Heaven received eight nominations, followed closely by Ghana's Agony of the Christ with seven nominations.

From a Whisper won five awards, including Best Picture, Best Director (Wanuri Kahiu) and Best Soundtrack. Gugu and Andile landed the second spot with three awards. Battle of the Souls, Seventh Heaven, Small Boy, Arugba and Live to Remember each won two awards.

== Winners ==
=== Major awards ===
The winners of the 23 Award Categories are listed first and highlighted in bold letters.

Best Picture	Best Director
From a Whisper (Kenya); Arugba (Nigeria); Gugu and Andile (South Africa); Battle of the Souls (Uganda); Seventh Heaven (Egypt)	Wanuri Kahiu – From a Whisper; Tunde Kelani – Arugba; Minky Schlesinger – Gugu and Andile; Matt Bish – Battle of the Souls; Saad Hendawy – Seventh Heaven
Best Actress in a leading role	Best Actor in a leading role
Funke Akindele – Jenifa; Stephanie Okereke and Nse Etim – Reloaded; Stella Damasus-Aboderin – State of the Heart; Corine Onyango – From a Whisper; Nadia Buari – Agony of the Christ	Farouk Al-Fichawi – Seventh Heaven; Godfrey Odhiamba – From a Whisper; Mike Ezuruonye – The Assassin; Majid Michel – Agony of the Christ; Peter Badejo – Arugba
Best Actress in a Supporting Role	Best Actor in a Supporting Role
Mercy Johnson – Live to Remember; Aggie Kebirungi – Battle of the Souls; Mosunmola Filani – Jenifa; Daphney Hlomoku – Gugu and Andile; Chika Ike – The Assassin	Joel Okuyo Atiku – Battle of the Souls; Femi Adebayo – Apaadi; Abubakar Mvenda & Ken Ambani – From a Whisper; Neil Mc Carthy – Gugu and Andile; Yemi Blaq – Grey Focus
Most Promising Actress	Most Promising Actor
Lungelo Dhladha – Gugu and Andile; Bhaira Mcwizu – Cindy’s Note; Bukola Awoyemi – Arugba; Lydia Farson – Scorned; Béa Flore Mfouemoun – Mah Sa-Sah	Litha Booi – Gugu and Andile; Mavila Anthana Keriario – Battle of the Souls; Ruffy Samuel – Dead End; Segun Adefila – Arugba; Sherif Ramzy – Seventh Heaven
Best Animation	Best Film in an African Language
Kono (Burkina Faso); Leila (Burkina Faso); Little Learning is different (Kenya); Manani Ogre (Kenya); Cheprono (Kenya)	Gugu and Andile (South Africa) in Zulu and Xhosa - Minky Schlesinger; Arugba (Nigeria) in Yoruba – Tunde Kelani; Mah Sa-Sah (Cameroon) in Cameroonian languages – Daniel Kamwa; Uyai (Nigeria) in Ibibio – Emem Isong; Apaadi (Nigeria) in Yoruba
Best Child Actor	Best Screenplay
Richard Chukwuma – Small Boy; Celia Greenwoood – The Assassin; Shanlar Kirunga – Battle of the Souls; Samara Milgwi – From a Whisper	From a Whisper – Wanuri Kahiu; Seventh Heaven – Zainab Aziz; Through the Glass – Stephanie Okereke; Reloaded – Emem Isong; Beautiful soul – Tchidi Chikere

=== Additional awards ===
Best Documentary Feature	Best Documentary Short
For the Best and for the Onion (Niger) & Malcolm’s Echo Joint prize; Private Files (Egypt); Shit on the Rock (Nigeria); Grandma’s not Home (South Africa)	Coming of Age (Kenya); Per Second Killer (Nigeria); Santos the survivor (Kenya); Lost in the South (Rwanda); Congo my foot (South Africa)
AMAA Achievement in Sound	AMAA Achievement in Editing
Seventh Heaven (Egypt); From a Whisper (Kenya); Battle of the Souls (Uganda); Gugu and Andile (South Africa); Grey Focus (Nigeria)	From a Whisper (Kenya); Cindy’s Note (Nigeria); Reloaded (Nigeria); Modupe Temi (Nigeria); Battle of the Souls (Uganda)
AMAA Achievement in Art Direction	AMAA Achievement in Cinematography
Small Boy – Michelle Bello; Five Apostles – Ifeanyi Onyeabor; Agony of the Christ – Jude Odoh; From a Whisper – Kay Tuckerman; Revolution – Eddybongo Uka	Cindy’s Note – Izu Ojukwu; From a Whisper – Marius Van Graan; Seventh Heaven – Ramses Marzouk; Gugu and Andile – Greg Heimann; Battle of the Souls – Stephen Njero and Tony Matomi
AMAA Achievement in Makeup	AMAA Achievement in Costume
Live to Remember; Agony of the Christ; From a Whisper; The Assassin; Ase n’tedumare	Arugba; Agony of the Christ; Apaadi; Live to Remember; Seventh Heaven
Best Original Soundtrack	AMAA Achievement in Visual Effect
From a Whisper; Arugba; Beautiful Soul; Agony of the Christ; Jenifa	Battle of the Souls; Five Apostles; Smoke and Mirrors; Agony of the Christ; Revolution
Heart of Africa (This award is given to the Best Film in Nigeria)
Arugba - Tunde Kelani; Cindy’s Note - Izu Ojukwu; Beautiful Soul - Tchidi Chikere; State of the Heart - Kingsley Omoife and Richard Mofe-Damijo; Jenifa - Funke Akindele

== Films with multiple nominations ==
The following films received multiple nominations.

- 12 nominations
  - From a Whisper
  10 nominations
  - Battle of the Soul
  - Gugu and Andile
  9 nominations
  - Arugba
  8 nominations
  - Seventh Heaven
  7 nominations
  - Agony of the Christ
  4 nominations
  - Cindy's Note
  - The Assassin
  - Jenifa

- 3 nominations
  - Beautiful Soul
  - Reloaded
  - Live to Remember
  - Apaadi
  2 nominations
  - Grey Focus
  - Revolution
  - Five Apostles
  - Reloaded
  - Small Boy
  - Mah Sa-Sah
  - State of the Heart

== Films with multiple awards ==
The following films received multiple awards.

- 5 awards
  - From a Whisper
- 3 awards
  - Gugu and Andile
- 2 awards
  - Arugba
  - Battle of the Soul
  - Seventh Heaven
  - Small Boy
  - Live to Remember
