= Simon Hansen =

Simon Hansen may refer to:

- Simon Hansen (filmmaker), South African filmmaker
- Simon Hansen (athlete) (born 1998), Danish sprinter

== See also ==
- Simon Hanson (born 1974), English drummer, songwriter and producer
