= Mbabazi =

Mbabazi is a surname. Notable people with the surname include:

- Amama Mbabazi, (born 1949), Ugandan politician
- Esther Mbabazi (born 1949), Rwandan pilot
- Jacqueline Mbabazi (born 1954), Ugandan educator, politician and businesswoman
- Janet Mbabazi (born 1996), Ugandan cricketer
- Lillian Mbabazi (born 1984), Rwandan-Ugandan recording artist and entertainer
- Pamela Mbabazi (born 1969), Ugandan university professor, academic, and academic administrator
- Philbert Aimé Mbabazi (born 1990), Rwandan filmmaker
- Rosemary Mbabazi, Rwandan businesswoman and politician
