= Hamu Beya – The Sand Fishers =

Hamu Beya - The Sand Fishers
- Directed by: Andrey Samoute Diarra
- Distributed by: Icarus Films
- Release date: 2014
- Running time: 72 minutes
- Country: Mali

Hamu Beya – The Sand Fishers is a 2014 Malian documentary film about the Bozo people in Mali directed by Andrey Samoute Diarra. The film received the Best Documentary award alongside Portrait of a Lone Farmer at the 10th Africa Movie Academy Awards.
