= Bad Black =

2016 Ugandan film directed by Nabwana I.G.G

- Directed by: Nabwana I.G.G.
- Written by: Nabwana I.G.G. Alan Ssali Hofmanis
- Produced by: Nabwana I.G.G. Alan Ssali Hofmanis
- Starring: Gloria Nalwanga; Alan Ssali Hofmanis; Dauda Bisaso
- Narrated by: VJ Emmie
- Cinematography: Nabwana I.G.G.
- Edited by: Nabwana I.G.G.
- Music by: Vincent Kizito
- Production company: Ramon Film Productions
- Distributed by: Wakaliwood
- Release dates: September 25, 2016 (Fantastic Fest); December 21, 2019 (YouTube)
- Running time: 69 minutes
- Country: Uganda
- Languages: Luganda; English
- Budget: US$65

Bad Black is a 2016 Ugandan action-comedy film written, produced, and directed by Isaac Godfrey Geoffrey Nabwana (IGG), by Wakaliwood, an ultra low-budget studio in Kampala, Uganda.

== Plot ==
A man named Swaaz, short for Schwarzenegger, robs a bank and gets chased by police. He orders his child assistant, Buddy Spencer, to jump from the car with the money as he leads police elsewhere. After being chased for some time, Swaaz is eventually trapped and is killed when he accidentally shoots his car, causing it to explode.

In the slums of Kampala, Uganda, a young girl runs away from home and ends up in a child trafficking ring led by a former Uganda People's Defence Force commando in the ghetto. One day, while collecting metal scraps, she is viciously assaulted by multi-millionaire Hirigi when she mistakenly takes the tire iron from his van. After enduring weeks of abuse and witnessing the death of a friend, the girl takes matters into her own hands and kills the ringleader.

Ten years later, the girl has grown up to become "Bad Black", leading the same group of ghetto children to become the biggest crime syndicate in Kampala. She seduces Hirigi in a bar to exact her revenge on him. Meanwhile, Alan Ssali, an American doctor whose whole family were allegedly U.S. Army commandos, is in Kampala giving aid to the people of the slums. He encounters Bad Black, who mistakes him for a commando due to his designer dog tags. After receiving Alan's business card, Bad Black sneaks into his hotel and steals his money and passport. When the police refuse to help him, Alan receives "kung fu commando training" from his young assistant, known by his pseudonym "Wesley Snipes", before storming through the slums to look for Bad Black.

Hirigi's teenage son, Kenny, is banished by his father and goes to Black's gang in search for drugs. Hirigi tells Black about his plans to buy the ghetto and throw the gang out. Bad Black brings Hirigi to her grandmother, where it is revealed that Hirigi is her grandfather and that he has been dating a ghetto woman. Hirigi threatens Bad Black by throwing her out and runs away disgusted.

One day, a drug deal between Bad Black and a rival syndicate is disrupted by police. The gangsters frantically run away only to be gunned down by Alan, who corners Bad Black and recovers his dog tags and hands her to the police. At the prison, she's intimidated by the prison gang leader Supazilla, but eventually befriends her. Bad Black then meets a fellow female inmate named Flavia who claims that her rich father banished her and that she never got to see her own child after birth before being taken to prison. Later that night, Kenny and the syndicate attempt to break Bad Black out. The following riot allows two other women to escape, but Bad Black stays with Flavia to comfort her as she is set to be released in two days; Bad Black is caught offscreen, and Kenny is subdued and captured alive. Days later, Flavia is released and is present at Bad Black's trial. Bad Black explains that her father was Swaaz and that he robbed the bank to pay for the expenses of her birth but also claims that her mother was killed during the birth. It is then revealed that Flavia is Bad Black's mother and the two hug as the court is adjourned.

Three months later, Alan resumes his medical mission in Wakaliga, but with Bad Black as his nurse. Hirigi's wife suddenly appears and opens fire at the medical camp, killing Alan in the process.

== Cast ==
- Gloria Nalwanga as Bad Black
  - Beatrice Kirabo as young Bad Black
- Alan Ssali Hofmanis as Doctor Alan Ssali
- Dauda Bisaso as Hirigi
- Janati Nakaye as Mukyala Hiriji
- Rolean Kasule as Wesley Snipes
- Mohammed Ssebankyaye as Swaaz
- Henry Mugisha as Buddy Spencer
- Hawah Nabatanzi as Flavia
  - Madinah Nakatudde as young Flavia
- John Kabuye as Chairman
- Racheal Nattembo as Racheal
- Joseph Okello as Cobra
- Annet Namatovu as Maama Black
- Muhumuza as the Judge
- VJ Emmie as the voice of Video Joker

== Release and reception ==
Bad Black had its world premiere at the 2016 Fantastic Fest, where it won the Audience Award and Nabwana IGG won the Best Director award for Action Features.

The film was released alongside Who Killed Captain Alex? in the Wakaliwood Supa Action Vol. 1 Blu-ray/DVD combo by the American Genre Film Archive (AGFA) on 14 May 2019. The Blu-ray release features the option to watch Who Killed Captain Alex? with or without the VJ Emmie narration, plus subtitles in 40 languages, and welcome videos by Nabwana IGG for 14 countries.

Much like Who Killed Captain Alex?, Bad Black was generally received well by critics and audiences alike. Richard Kuipers of Variety called the film "A no-budget brew of comedy, action and wisecracking voiceover narration by self-taught Ugandan filmmaker Nabwana I.G.G."

Bad Black was a critical and audience favorite at the 2017 Seattle International Film Festival. The film earned an encore presentation on the last day of the festival, making the total number of screenings four. The Seattle audience question and answer session with the director was on Skype.
