= Do You Believe in Magic =

Do You Believe in Magic may refer to:

- Do You Believe in Magic, a 1990 children's book by Saviour Pirotta
- Do You Believe in Magic? (book), a 2013 book by Paul Offit about alternative medicine
- Do You Believe in Magic (film), a 2008 documentary film
- Do You Believe in Magic (album), an album by the Lovin' Spoonful
- Do You Believe in Magic?, 1980 album by Japanese singer Susan
- "Do You Believe in Magic" (song), by the Lovin' Spoonful 1965, covered by several artists
- "Do You Believe in Magic" (Modern Family), a 2017 television episode
- "Do You Believe In Magic?" (The Super Mario Bros. Super Show!), a 1990 live-action The Super Mario Bros. Super Show! episode

== See also ==
- Do You Believe (disambiguation)
