= Wako (film) =

2016 Ugandan drama film

- Directed by: Zziwa Aaron Alone
- Written by: Zziwa Aaron Alone
- Produced by: Natuhwera Brighton
- Starring: Geoffrey Echakara; Natuhwera Brighton; Robert Ernest Bbumba; Zziwa Aaron Alone
- Cinematography: Wamasebu Eric
- Edited by: Wamasebu Eric
- Distributed by: Zaron Motion Pictures; Brina Motion Pictures; Punchside Filmz
- Release dates: January 2015 (Arusha International Film Festival); 1 October 2016 (Uganda)
- Running time: 86 minutes
- Country: Uganda
- Language: English

Wako is a 2015 Ugandan thriller film directed by Zziwa Aaron Alone and co-produced by director himself with Natuhwera Brighton and Wamasebu Eric for Zaron Motion Pictures, Brina Motion Pictures and Punchside Filmz respectively. It is the sequel to its first feature film Hadithi za Kumekucha:TUNU. The film stars Geoffrey Echakara in titular lead role along with Natuhwera Brighton, Robert Ernest Bbumba and Zziwa Aaron Alone in supportive roles.

The film was filmed from mid 2014 to mid 2015 in the slums and urban slums of Kampala. The film deals with story of a 23-year-old male thug called Wako who is released from prison and tying to start a new life, but he got to know that his sister is suffering from a cancer.

The trailer of the film went viral through social media. The film was premiered on 1 October 2016 at Theatre La’bonita. The film received critical acclaim and won several awards at international film festivals. In 2015, the film won the award for the Best Feature Film in the Arusha International Film Festival in Tanzania.

== Cast ==
- Geoffrey Echakara as Wako
- Natuhwera Brighton as Sera
- Aaron Zziwa as Kujjo
- Robert Ernest Bbumba as Muggy
- Diana Nabatanzi
