= State Research Bureau =

The State Research Bureau may refer to:

- State Research Bureau (organisation), the Ugandan secret police under Idi Amin
- State Research Bureau (film), a 2011 Ugandan action film
