= Corine Onyango =

Kenyan actress and radio presenter

- Born: 1984 or 1985 (age 40–41)
- Education: Northwestern University
- Occupations: Actress, radio presenter
- Years active: 2008-present
- Notable work: From a Whisper (2008)

Corine Onyango (born 1984 or 1985) is a Kenyan actress and radio presenter.

== Biography ==
Corine Amolo Onyango was born in Cote D' Ivoire. Her father, Tony Elisha Onyango worked for the African Development Bank. Her mother, Ruth Apondi nee Ogola worked as head administration at various international schools including Abidjan, Nairobi, and Tunis. She has two sisters, Janet and Annabel, and a brother, Tony. Onyango attended Northwestern University, where she studied communications and graduated in 2007. After graduation, she came back to Kenya on vacation and ended up deciding to stay. Onyango found a job as a radio presenter after her cousin Nina Ogot mention that there was an opening at Homeboyz Radio. She became the host of ‘The Jumpoff’, a hip hop show. Onyango described it as a step by step learning experience for the company and herself.

In 2008, Onyango made her film debut in Wanuri Kahiu's From a Whisper. She plays Tamani, the daughter of a businessman who learns that her long-absent mother was killed in the 1998 bombing in Nairobi, and copes by making graffiti in the memorial park. She was nominated for Best Actress in a Leading Role at the Africa Movie Academy Awards. In 2010, Onyango voiced the dragonfly in the children's TV series Tinga Tinga Tales.

Onyango has a young son, King Kwe. She speaks English and French.

== Filmography ==
- 2008: From a Whisper
- 2010: Tinga Tinga Tales (TV series)
