= Pumzi =

- Directed by: Wanuri Kahiu
- Written by: Wanuri Kahiu
- Produced by: Simon Hansen; Amira Quinlan; Hannah Slezacek; Steven Markovitz
- Starring: Kudzani Moswela; Chantelle Burger; Nicole Bailey
- Cinematography: Grant Appleton
- Edited by: Dean Leslie
- Music by: Siddhartha Barnhoorn
- Production company: Inspired Minority Pictures
- Distributed by: Focus Features; Awali Entertainment; Goethe-Institut; Inspired Minority Pictures; Universal Pictures Home Entertainment (UPHE)
- Release date: 21 October 2009 (Kenya Film Festival)
- Running time: 21 minutes
- Countries: South Africa; Kenya
- Language: English
- Budget: $35,000

Pumzi (transl. Breath) is a Kenyan science-fiction short film written and directed by Wanuri Kahiu. It was screened at the 2010 Sundance Film Festival as part of its New African Cinema program. The project was funded with grants from the Changamoto arts fund, as well as from the Goethe Institut and Focus Features' Africa First short film program which are also to distribute the work. Kahiu hopes to expand the short into a full-length feature. The film is in English, but the title is Swahili for "Breath".

== Plot ==
Pumzi begins with a teletype caption that places the film spatially in the Maitu community of the East African Territory and temporally 35 years after World War III or The Water War. In Kikuyu, the word "Maitu" stems from the roots 'truth' and "our," and in everyday usage, 'our truth' signifies 'mother.' A placard marks a seedpod of the Mother Tree, contained in a glass jar. The Maitu community contains open spaces, windows with cast cityscapes, and hallways that are well maintained and lit. Although only a small portion of the Maitu community is ever shown, as Asha walks through the hallway, she stops to admire the scenery. Portions of the community are visible through the window, which gives the sense that the community is large, though not how large or how extensive it is. Because of the harsh conditions, the lack of resources, and concerns about radiation, all citizens are confined within the walls of the community.

The Maitu community is powered by manual energy production machines: treadmills and rowing machines which produce no pollution. Each citizen is allotted a small amount of daily water, and they are meticulous in their conservation of water. For example, in the bathroom, urine and sweat are recycled and kept in a personal water bottle.

The curator of the Virtual Natural History Museum, Asha, receives an anonymous package that contains a small soil sample. She tests the soil and finds no radiation and a high level of moisture. She tests the sample with technology and uses her senses. When she takes a deep breath and inhales the smell of the soil, she is plunged into a vision, into a deep pool of water. Based on both the technical tests and her own biological dream and vision, Asha comes to believe life may have returned outside the community.

Asha meets virtually with the Maitu Council, three women. Maitu is a contained society; citizens are not free to leave. Whoever wants to leave must ask permission from the council. She informs the Council members; they almost automatically deny that life is possible outside. To prove them wrong, Asha places her hand on a scanner, which projects her dream of the green tree from the opening sequence of the film and the pool of water from her vision. They dismiss the visions as a 'dream. Dreaming has been shown already as prevented by wake up alarms and the command to take medicine. Asha's vision fares no better. The Council' deny her visa, declare Asha sick and send in a security team that destroys all evidence. The enforcers haul Asha from the lab and compel her to produce energy on one of the machines; a darker side of Maitu's self sufficiency.

With the help of a bathroom attendant, Asha breaks out of the compound into the sunlight. Even though she has never seen the outside world, which is full of, mostly plastic, garbage, she understands she has to make coverings for her feet and a head scarf to block sun and wind, for which she puts refuse to good use. Tellingly, we see bags of garbage ejected from the city into the landscape; Maitu has learned all lesson, after all. Asha struggles through the harsh elements following a compass to where the soil sample came from. She sees the tree of her dream: a mirage. Finding nothing alive, Asha digs a hole in the sand and plants the Mother Tree. As she pours the last of her water and wrings out the last of her own sweat onto the small plant, she lies down to protect and nurture the bud.

In a reverse of the opening scene, the camera pulls up. As the shot widens, we see a tree growing rapidly, apparently right out of Asha's body.

== Themes ==
=== Africanfuturism ===
Pumzi falls squarely within the genre of Africanfuturism. It depicts a future state of civilisation (located on the African continent) that is predominantly populated by Black people. Additionally, it is produced by a South African studio composed of a group of creators who are creating and popularising innovative forms of cultural content from within African nations. Pumzi aligns well with motifs commonly found in Africanfuturism including, but not limited to, the presence of barren landscapes and the central role of water.

=== Ecocriticism ===
Pumzi can be said to function as a critique on ecotopic narratives. Through technology, all materials can be recycled in a closed loop no-waste system, yet this system is part of a set of institutional oppressions in which bodies (and minds) are perpetually monitored, invaded, and used as resources.

=== Scarcity/Reclamation ===
Pumzi explores the potential social, political, and psychological implications of a world defined by intensified scarcity of resources like water and natural, organic life itself; the director has commented that the movie was in part inspired by her annoyance with the cost of bottled water. The members of the internal community, protected from the world, are responsible for generating their own electricity on machines (like treadmills, bike machines, rowing machines) that convert human energy into electricity. In addition to this, the residents of the community are rationed tiny amounts of water and required to store their urine so it can be purified and re-used without being wasted. These governing rules hint at the kind of political controls that are often employed to manage scarcity. These governing rules are linked to a broader matrix of social, political, and psychological controls where "The Council" has the final say over the actions of residents under punishment of arrest or confinement.

=== Communication ===
The film critiques some of the burgeoning anxieties surrounding inter-personal communication in the contemporary moment. In the world of Pumzi, communication is largely facilitated through technology, an interface in which the voice can be heard and the face seen but no emotions or active speaking detected. The emotional impact behind inter-personal communication moves to the fingers as Asha types out her messages, mirroring the shifts currently occurring today. Additionally, Asha's interactions with the bathroom janitor, the character with whom she perhaps has the most human relationship, are entirely wordless. The lack of dialogue throughout the film further reinforces the cool efficiency of the colony while portraying the potential for technological innovation to deteriorate genuine interpersonal relations.

== Cast ==
- Kudzani Moswela as Asha
- Chantelle Burger as Cleaner
- Tammy Richards as P.
- Nicole Bailey as Binti
- Freddy Djanabia as Guard 1
- Anton David Jeftha as Guard 2
- Arthur Cornelisser as Guard 3
- Marius Botha as Water Distributor
- Marlon Ryneveldt as Guard / Policeman
- Trymore Ndhlovu as Exercisor 1
- Cheslynn as Exercisor 2
- Henry Booysen as Exercisor 3
- Andy Kurehwatira as Exercisor 4
- Wolfgang Wienssenstein as Floor Cleaner

== Awards ==
Awarding Organisation	Category	Year	Nominee	Result
Venice Film Festival	Award of the City of Venice	2010	Pumzi	Won
Carthage Film Festival	Short Film	2010	Pumzi	Nominated
Carthage Film Festival	Official Competition	2010	Pumzi	Won
Dubai International Film Festival	Short	2010	Pumzi	Nominated
Kalasha International Film and TV Awards	Best Director	2011	Wanuri Kahiu	Won

== Releases ==
Pumzi was part of the anthology, Africa First: Volume 1.

== See also ==
- List of Afrofuturist films
