= Who Killed Captain Alex? =

2010 Ugandan film directed by Nabwana I.G.G

- Promotional release poster
- Directed by: Nabwana I.G.G.
- Written by: Nabwana I.G.G.
- Produced by: Nabwana I.G.G. Alan Ssali Hofmanis
- Starring: Kakule William; Ernest Sseruyna; Charles Bukenya; Prossy Nakyambadde
- Narrated by: VJ Emmie
- Cinematography: Nabwana I.G.G.
- Edited by: Nabwana I.G.G.
- Music by: Kizito Vicent
- Production company: Ramon Film Productions
- Distributed by: Wakaliwood
- Release date: 1 March 2010
- Running time: 68 minutes
- Country: Uganda
- Languages: Luganda; English
- Budget: $85

Who Killed Captain Alex? is a 2010 Ugandan independent martial arts action comedy film written, produced, and directed by Isaac Godfrey Geoffrey Nabwana also known as Nabwana IGG, by Wakaliwood, an ultra low-budget studio in Kampala, Uganda. The film tells the story of a civil unrest which erupts after the assassination of a beloved Ugandan soldier, the eponymous Captain Alex. It gained viral notoriety for being a no-budget action film, produced on a reported budget of under $200 although producer Alan Hofmanis later stated that the production value was in fact $85.

A trailer was uploaded to YouTube in January 2010 and the full film was uploaded in March 2015, and has over ten million views as of 8 July 2025. The original cut was lost due to power outages and "strained conditions" according to Nabwana, while the surviving version of Who Killed Captain Alex? released online includes commentary from the first English-speaking "Video Joker" that includes running gags about the characters.

Who Killed Captain Alex? was generally well received by critics and audiences alike, who saw it as an endearing "so bad it's good" experience, despite its technical limitations.

== Plot ==
Captain Alex, one of the most decorated officers in the Uganda People's Defence Force, is sent out to capture the crime boss Richard and his Tiger Mafia, a criminal organization that controls the drug trade of the city of Kampala. Alex sets up camp in the village of Wakaliga. After doing so, his soldiers go to a bar where a fight ensues between them and the villagers. Alex breaks it up and takes them out of the bar.

Alex and his soldiers locate the Tiger Mafia during a drug deal and infiltrate it. In the following fight, Martin, Richard's brother is captured. Richard berates his men, shoots his wife Ritah in his fit of rage, and then swears revenge against Alex. He orders a spy to seduce Alex in his tent and sends the mafia to capture him later that night. However, Alex is killed by an unknown source, leaving the mafia and his soldiers in disarray.

Captain Alex's brother, a Shaolin kung fu expert known as "Bruce U" (i.e. the "Ugandan Bruce Lee") arrives at Kampala the next morning in search of the murderer and finds a Tiger Mafia card in Alex's tent. Elsewhere, the mafia tells Richard that Alex is dead; Richard becomes irate because he wanted Alex brought to him. Bruce goes to a shaolin temple where he fights the other martial artists until the master appears. Bruce asks the master for help on his quest for vengeance, but the latter declines.

Bruce goes to the forest to train for his quest on his own. After sleeping in a tree, he discovers Ritah, who has amnesia after being shot by her husband. Bruce, unaware that she was part of the Tiger Mafia, comes to her aid. After training in a nearby lake, he discovers that Ritah was a member of the mafia due to a tattoo with the mafia's initials. Ritah regains her memory and agrees to take Bruce to the Tiger Mafia base.

The UPDF hires a new military leader who formulates a plan to attack the mafia's base. However, his plan is overheard by Richard through the phone of a turncoat police officer. Richard gathers the mafia at the base to prepare and sends one of his men to steal an AH-64 Apache (Note: An AH-64 Apache model was used as a 3D stock helicopter in the movie.) from the police to bomb Kampala to serve as a distraction for the government. Bruce invades the mafia's base, but is captured and brought to Richard, who orders three of his men to fight him with combat skills. Bruce holds his own for some time but is eventually overwhelmed. The military bombs the base with a AH-64 helicopter from the Uganda Air Force, (Note: The video joker narrates that the attack helicopter came from the Ugandan Ghetto Air Force.) forcing the mafia into a forest where they fight the UPDF.

After the chaotic fighting, the entire mafia is dead and only Richard remains. He strips the gun off one of his deceased men, kills a number of soldiers, and takes down the military helicopter but is eventually shot and captured. Amid the chaos, riots break out in Kampala and the Ugandan government places the city under martial law. Alex's killer is never identified.

== Cast ==
- Kakule William as Captain Alex: Uganda's "best soldier", tasked with destroying the Tiger Mafia.
- Ernest Sseruyna as Richard: Leader of the Tiger Mafia.
- Charles Bukenya as Bruce U: Captain Alex's brother and Shaolin martial artist.
- Prossy Nakyambadde as Ritah: One of Richard's many wives.
- G. Puffs as Puffs: Richard's "Russian" subordinate.
- Faizat Muhammed as Natasha
- Bonny Kaggwa as Minister
- Babirye Ssekweyama as Vicky
- Dauda Bisaso as Rocky
- David Musisi as Tom
- Ivan Ssebanja as the Master
- VJ Emmie as the Video Joker

== Production ==
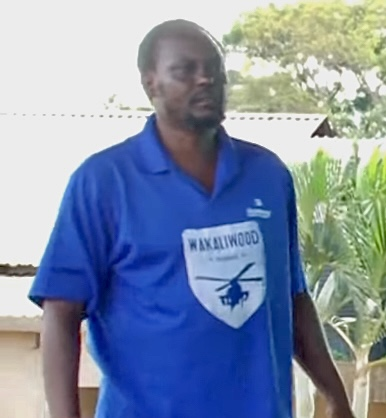
Director Isaac Godfrey Geoffrey Nabwana

Production began in late 2009 in the ghettos of Nateete. Nabwana was inspired to create the film by his love of Hollywood action movies and martial arts films from his childhood. The helicopter scenes in the film were based upon his experiences during the Ugandan Bush War where Nabwana and his brother were chased by a helicopter.

Nabwana shot the film in January 2010 and edited it using a computer he assembled from old parts. The film's props were all made in-house and camera equipment were fabricated from scrap metal at a machine shop next to Nabwana's house. The actors supplied their own costumes; one of them was given a mask so he could play two different roles in the same scene. Squibs used to simulate gunshot wounds were made from condoms filled with red food coloring and tied to fishing lines before being taped to the actors' chests; Nabwana previously used cow blood, but was forced to discontinue it after one of his actors developed brucellosis. Nabwama also included footage of sewage to make the film, this was done in order to show how "people want to see what they live in."

Nabwana has described his motivation to make the movie as a desire to change the perception that cinema is only for the rich in his home country of Uganda and to make his own films.

The original version of the film was intended for local distribution in Kampala, with the dialogue recorded in the native language of Luganda. After the Luganda trailer for the film went viral on YouTube, Nabwana reappropriated the local video joker practice for a Western audience and hired VJ Emmie to provide commentary on the film in English.

Throughout the film, a panpipes cover of the Seal song "Kiss from a Rose", as well as a piano cover of the ABBA song "Mamma Mia", can be heard. The "Kiss from a Rose" cover has been described as one of the best versions of the song by Screen Rant.

== Release and reception ==
Who Killed Captain Alex? sold over 10,000 copies in DVD sales in Uganda, and pirated copies of the film have sold an estimated 10 times that amount.

The official trailer of the film uploaded to YouTube on 30 January 2010 quickly developed a cult following. The film itself was uploaded on Wakaliwood's YouTube channel. As of 8 July 2025, it has over 10 million views.

The film was released alongside Bad Black in the Wakaliwood Supa Action Vol. 1 Blu-ray/DVD combo by the American Genre Film Archive (AGFA) on 14 May 2019. The Blu-ray release features the option to watch Who Killed Captain Alex? with or without the VJ Emmie narration, plus subtitles in 11 languages, and welcome videos by Nabwana IGG for 14 countries.

Who Killed Captain Alex? was generally received well by critics and audiences alike, who saw it as an endearing "so bad it's good" experience, despite its technical limitations. BBC referred to Nabwana as the "Ugandan Tarantino" after the film's release. The film retains high popularity among youth in Uganda. Other commenters found the passion and determination behind the filmmakers as inspiring and considered the film very important.

The film is also credited with inspiring the Ugandan Knuckles online meme in early 2018.

== Sequel ==
Nabwana IGG completed work on the 2010 sequel Tebaatusasula (Luganda: "Those Who Were Screwed Over") when a massive power surge in Wakaliga destroyed the hard drive that contained the film footage, resulting in it becoming a lost film.

On 2 March 2015, Wakaliwood set up a Kickstarter campaign to raise US$160 for the film Tebaatusasula: Ebola. The studio was able to receive US$13,181 from 374 backers by 1 April. Tebaatusasula: Ebola serves as the direct sequel to Who Killed Captain Alex? and a remake of the lost Tebaatusasula film.

On 1 August 2022, Nabwana IGG's Twitter announced that a sequel was in production and that shooting was currently in progress.

On 8 November 2026, the Wakaliwood Instagram account posted news that Kakule William, the actor for Captain Alex, had died. No cause of death was made public.
