= Mr. Ability =

Mr. Ability is a 2016 short Ugandan documentary film about Simon Peter Lubega, a crippled artisan in Kampala. It was directed by Joel Okuyo Atiku and won the International Category at the Focus on Ability Awards 2016 in Australia by the decision of the judges. Mr. Ability was the Special Request Screening for the December 2016 UN Human Rights Day in Morocco. It also won the award for Best Documentary at Pearl (of Africa) International Film Festival (PIFF) in Kampala. The music score includes a Ugandan song with the same title performed by Radio & Weasel featuring Rabadaba. Mr. Ability is a 5-minute eye opener to those who think disability is inability. It was nominated among the Top 10 Films for the Discovery Channel's Don't Stop Wondering Africa Awards at the Jozi Film Festival in 2017.
