= The Route (2013 film) =

- Official poster
- Directed by: Jayant Maru
- Screenplay by: Jayant Maru
- Produced by: Jayant Maru
- Starring: Sharon Detoro; Esther Bwanika; Bwanika Baale Felix; Edlyn Sabrina; Thomas Kayondo; Debie Kagisha; Angie; Edward Isyagi
- Cinematography: Eric Wamasebu
- Music by: Producer Nessim
- Production company: Mahj Films
- Release date: 26 July 2013 (Uganda National Cultural Center)
- Country: Uganda
- Languages: Luganda & English

The Route is a Ugandan film directed by Jayant Maru, based on a screenplay he wrote. It is about human trafficking in Uganda.

== Cast ==
- Sharon Detoro as Samantha
- Thomas Kayondo as Sam
- Edlyn Sabrina as Sabrina
- Bwanika Baale Felix as Mr. Nyobobo
- Bwanika Esther as Mother
- Isaac Kuddzu as Sex Predator
- Ongaria Ezra as David

== Accolades ==
- Nominated for the Best Feature Film in Uganda's Film Festival (2013)
- Nominated for best Feature Film at the Silicon Valley African Film Festival (2013)
- Nominated for best feature Film at the Manya Human Rights Film Festival (2013)
- Won best feature film at the Nile Diaspora International Film Festival (2013)
- Official Selection at the FESTICAB Burundi Film Festival (2014)
- Nominated for best production in the Diaspora at Kalasha Awards (2014)
- Official Selection at the Herat International Women's Film Festival (2015)
- Won Best East African Feature Film at Mashariki African Film Festival (2015)
