= Battle of the Souls =

- Directed by: Matt Bish
- Starring: Joel Okuyo Atiku; Matthew Nabwiso; Mwita Athanas; Mike Draman; Agnes Kebirungi; Nancy Karanja; Niyi Owolabi.
- Music by: Priscilla Kalibala
- Production company: Media Pro
- Distributed by: Media Pro
- Release date: April 29, 2007
- Country: Uganda
- Language: English

Battle of the Souls is a 2007 supernatural Ugandan thriller directed by Matt Bish. It featured in the 28th African Film Festival of Verona (Italy). Dubbed the 'first' Ugawood feature film, it was also Matt's maiden film after returning home to Kampala in 2005 from film school in Amsterdam. He assembled a cast that made film history. It received 10 nominations at the 5th Africa Movie Academy Awards and eventually scooped the awards for Best Visual Effect and Best Supporting Actor.

== Plot ==
A young reporter (called Ryan, played by Matthew Nabwiso) loses his girlfriend and job in one day. Then one evening while drinking with his longtime buddies at a bar, he comes across a cash-filled briefcase belonging to a mysterious underworld lord. Greed and conflict over the possession of the money begins to erode their friendship. Depressed and in a vulnerable position, Ryan agrees to join the underworld lord's organisation. Unknown to him, the organisation is actually a cult that sacrifices humans in exchange for wealth and beauty.

== Production ==
With the tagline: "They are here to get you back...", filming started in 2006. The production company was Media Pro, created in February 2005 and under Roger Mugisha, as the Managing Director.

== Cast ==
- Matthew Nabwiso as Ryan
- Mwita Athanas
- Mike Draman as Eric
- Joel Okuyo as Wycliffe
- Agnes Kebirungi
- Nancy Karanja
- Niyi Owolabi
- Shix Kapyyenga
- Shanlar Kirunga

== Soundtrack ==
The music score for Battle of the Souls was performed by Priscilla Kalibala, a Ugandan artist.

== Release ==
The film was released in cinemas on 29 April 2007, and it has run on local channels like NTV too. It's about 105 minutes long.

== Reception ==
The film came during a period when Ugandans were hearing so many stories about people going to the underworld ("under water") to get wealth and therefore had a compelling tale. Matt Bish started writing the movie in 2003 just after Roger Mugisha, leader of the Shadow's Angels, became born again (or "got saved"). He just read about Roger (now a Radio Presenter) in interviews and newspaper articles on the net. Matt is a GOD-fearing man. He was always hoping to have his first feature film and wanted it to have a Christian theme. And it was well-received winning numerous awards. "The film is talking about how people are drawn to the underworld to operate in the dark world, the evil world."
