= Do You Believe? =

Do You Believe? or Do You Believe may refer to:

- "Do You Believe?" (The Beatnuts song)
- "Do You Believe" (Julie-Anne Dineen song)
- "Do You Believe" (Maurice Williams song)
- Do You Believe? (film)
- Do You Believe? (Cher tour)
  - "Believe" (Cher song)

== See also ==
- Do You Believe in Magic (disambiguation)
