= Tinga Tinga Tales =

Animated children's series

- Genre: Children's television
- Created by: Claudia Lloyd
- Written by: Edward Gakuya; Robert Mwampembwa; Judy Kibinge; Anna Starkey; Bruce Hobson; Bridget Hurst; Claudia Lloyd
- Directed by: Richard Jeffrey
- Voices of: Eugene Muchiri; Shaun Parkes; Johnnie Fiori; Lenny Henry; Patrice Naiambana; Miriam Margolyes
- Theme music composer: Eric Wainaina; Aaron Rimbui
- Opening theme: "Tinga Tinga Tinga"
- Composer: Eric Wainaina
- Countries of origin: United Kingdom; Kenya
- Original languages: English, Swahili
- No. of seasons: 2
- No. of episodes: 52

Production
- Executive producer: Andrew Zein
- Producer: Claudia Lloyd
- Editors: Ben Campbell; Brian Evusa; Adam Grant; Louisa Wanjiku; Edvine P. Maloba
- Running time: 11 minutes
- Production companies: Tiger Aspect Productions; Homeboyz Animation; Classic Media

Original release
- Network: CBeebies
- Release: 15 February 2010 – 31 March 2011

Tinga Tinga Tales is an animated children's television series based on African folk tales and aimed generally at 4 to 6-year-olds that ran for two seasons (2011–2012). It was commissioned by the BBC for its CBeebies channel. Named after Tingatinga art from Tanzania, Tinga Tinga Tales was produced in Nairobi, Kenya, by Homeboyz Animation and its music produced by Kenyan singer-songwriter Eric Wainaina. The series comprises 55 episodes.

The series was first conceived by Claudia Lloyd, head of the animation division at the London-based Tiger Aspect Productions, while travelling through Africa. The first three episodes premiered on the BBC website in February 2010. The distribution rights were bought by Entertainment Rights, which in 2009 merged with Classic Media. In 2012 Classic Media was acquired by DreamWorks Animation and renamed DreamWorks Classics).

== Synopsis ==
Tinga Tinga Tales centers around various animated animals and employs music, dialogue, and colorful imagery to tell African folk tales about the origins of these animals. Each tale is narrated by Red Monkey and answers questions such as "Why do monkeys swing in the trees?" and "Why do flamingos stand on one leg?"

== Characters ==
=== Main characters ===
- Red Monkey (voiced by Eugene Muchiri (UK)/Geoffrey Curtin (US)) is the narrator of the series.
- Elephant (voiced by Lenny Henry) has a big head, but a tiny brain.
- Lion (voiced by Patrice Naiambana) is the king of Tinga Tinga.
- Tortoise (voiced by Shaun Parkes) is the smartest animal in Tinga Tinga.
- Hippo (voiced by Johnnie Fiori)
- Tickbird (voiced by Tameka Empson (UK)/Elizabeth Curtin (US)) is Hippo's best friend.
- Orange Monkey (voiced by Ben Spybey (Season 1)/Karuga Ngigi (Season 2))
- Yellow Monkey (voiced by Faraaz Meghani)

=== Recurring characters ===
- Crocodile (voiced by Edward Kwach)
- Lizard (voiced by Junior Simpson)
- Buffalo (voiced by Lenny Henry)
- Bat (voiced by Prince Abura (UK)/Jules de Jongh (US))
- Frog (voiced by Wakanyote Njuguna)
- Warthog (voiced by Kennie Andrews)
- Porcupine (voiced by Catherine Wambua)
- Owl (voiced by Meera Syal) is very wise.
- Hen (voiced by Lindiwe Brown Mkhize)
- Peacock (voiced by Cyril Nri) takes pride in his beautiful colours.
- Chameleon (voiced by Patrick Kayeki (UK)/Kerry Shale (US)) loves to change colour.
- Hare (voiced by Felix Dexter (UK)/John Guerrasio (US)) loves to compete in races.
- Vulture (voiced by Felix Dexter (UK)/Lorelei King (US))
- Giraffe (voiced by Miriam Margolyes)
- Squirrel (voiced by Miriam Margolyes)
- Eagle (voiced by Ninia Benjamin) is the leader of all of Tinga Tinga's birds.
- Mosquito (voiced by Ninia Benjamin)
- Bushbaby (voiced by Bhumi Patel)
- Cheetah (voiced by Angelina Koinange (Season 1)/Sophie Okonedo (Season 2))
- Cubs (voiced by Tracy Rabar, Mikayla Odera, Cullie Ruto)
- Zebra (voiced by Eddie Kadi (UK)/Dan Russell (US))
- Parrot (voiced by Eddie Kadi) copies what other animals say.
- Snake (voiced by Johnny Daukes (UK)/Dan Russell (US))
- Aardvark (voiced by Johnny Daukes)
- Puff Adder (voiced by Johnny Daukes) is feared for his nasty bite, but he only bites when he is frightened.
- Hyena (voiced by Stephen K Amos)
- Millipede/Pediless (voiced by Stephen K Amos)
- Jackal (voiced by Terence Reis)
- Rhino (voiced by Terence Reis)
- Crab (voiced by Terence Reis)
- Ants (voiced by Terence Reis)
- Chief Ant (voiced by Peter King)
- Lieutenant Ant (voiced by Eric Wainaina)
- Wildebeests (voiced by Terence Reis) are all very dopey.
- Flamingo (voiced by Flaminia Cinque)
- Ostrich (voiced by Janet Suzman)
- Camel (voiced by Paul Shearer (UK)/Jim Cummings (US))
- Dragonfly (voiced by Corine Onyango)
- Leopard (voiced by Dona Croll)
- Baboon (voiced by Anton Rice) is very naughty and mischievous.
- Guinea Fowl (voiced by Rosemary Leach)
- Meerkat (voiced by Morwenna Banks)
- Impala (voiced by Claudia Lloyd)
- Bees (voiced by Claudia Lloyd)
- Queen Bee (voiced by Penelope Keith)
- Fish (voiced by Claudia Lloyd)
- Cricket (voiced by Derek Griffiths)
- Tinga Tinga Birds (voiced by Atemi Oyungu, Muthoni Mburu) are chorus singers in Tinga Tinga.
- Skunk (voiced by Derek Griffiths)
- Caterpillar/Butterfly (voiced by Akiya Henry)
- Woodpecker (voiced by Akiya Henry)
- Flea (voiced by Akiya Henry)
- Crow (voiced by Achieng Abura)
- Spider (voiced by Jocelyn Jee Esien)
- Hummingbird (voiced by Maureen Lipman)
- Mole (voiced by Sophie Thompson)
- Whale (voiced by Ruth Madoc)

=== Mysterious characters ===
- Majitu the Giant (voiced by Colin McFarlane)
- The Sleeping Stones (voiced by Nonso Anozie)
- The Wind (voiced by Terence Reis)

== Episodes ==
=== Series overview ===
| Series | Episodes | Originally released | |
| Series | Episodes | First released | Last released |
|---|---|---|---|
| 1 | 26 | 15 February 2010 | 29 April 2010 |
| 2 | 26 | 22 November 2010 | 31 March 2011 |

=== Pilot (2008) ===
- 0. Tinga Tinga Tales (2008)

=== Series 1 (2010) ===
- 1. Why Elephant Has a Trunk (15 February 2010)
- 2. Why Snake Has No Legs (16 February 2010)
- 3. Why Hippo Has No Hair (17 February 2010)
- 4. Why Tortoise Has a Broken Shell (18 February 2010)
- 5. Why Hen Pecks the Ground (19 February 2010)
- 6. Why Bat Hangs Upside-down (22 February 2010)
- 7. Why Warthog is So Ugly (23 February 2010)
- 8. Why Owl's Head Turns All the Way Round (24 February 2010)
- 9. Why Monkeys Swing in the Trees (25 February 2010)
- 10. Why Tickbird Sits on Hippo's Back (26 February 2010)
- 11. Why Frog Croaks (3 March 2010)
- 12. Why Spider Has a Tiny Waist (4 March 2010)
- 13. Why Vulture is Bald (5 March 2010)
- 14. Why Giraffe Has a Long Neck (6 March 2010)
- 15. Why Porcupine Has Quills (7 March 2010)
- 16. Why Lizard Hides Under Rocks (10 March 2010)
- 17. Why Crocodile Has a Bumpy Back (11 March 2010)
- 18. Why Jackal Howls at the Moon (12 March 2010)
- 19. Why Hare Hops (13 March 2010)
- 20. Why Mosquito Buzzes (16 March 2010)
- 21. Why Rhino Charges (19 April 2010)
- 22. Why Caterpillar is Never in a Hurry (20 April 2010)
- 23. Why Lion Roars (23 April 2010)
- 24. Why Zebra Has Stripes (24 April 2010)
- 25. Why Flamingo Stands on One Leg (28 April 2010)
- 26. Why Woodpecker Pecks (29 April 2010)

=== Series 2 (2010–11) ===
- 27. Why Ostrich Sticks Her Head in the Ground (22 November 2010)
- 28. Why Camel Has a Hump (23 November 2010)
- 29. Why Wildebeest Stampede (24 November 2010)
- 30. Why Chameleon Changes Colour (25 November 2010)
- 31. Why Leopard Has Spots (26 November 2010)
- 32. Why Hyena Has Short Back Legs (29 November 2010)
- 33. Why Ants Work Together (30 November 2010)
- 34. Why Flea Jumps (1 December 2010)
- 35. Why Hummingbird Hums (2 December 2010)
- 36. Why Baboon Has a Bare Bottom (3 December 2010)
- 37. Why Bees Sting (6 December 2010)
- 38. Why Peacock Struts (7 December 2010)
- 39. Why Aardvark Has a Sticky Tongue (8 December 2010)
- 40. Why Whale Spouts (9 December 2010)
- 41. Why Parrot Can't Keep a Secret (10 December 2010)
- 42. Why Bushbaby Has Big Eyes (21 March 2011)
- 43. Why Guinea Fowl Has Dots (22 March 2011)
- 44. Why Buffalo Has Horns (23 March 2011)
- 45. Why Puffadder Sheds His Skin (24 March 2011)
- 46. Why Eagle Rules the Skies (25 March 2011)
- 47. Why Skunk Smells (26 March 2011)
- 48. Why Cricket Chirrups (27 March 2011)
- 49. Why Mole Lives Underground (28 March 2011)
- 50. Why Squirrel Gathers Nuts (29 March 2011)
- 51. Why Meerkat is Always on the Lookout (30 March 2011)
- 52. Why Cheetah Has Tears (31 March 2011)

== Home media ==
The series was released on DVD in the United Kingdom by Universal Pictures UK and Classic Media.
