= A Good Catholic Girl =

- Directed by: Matt Bish
- Starring: Maureen Kulany; Joel Okuyo Atiku; Matthew Nabwiso; Brenda Ibarah; Tibba Murungi; Sharon Amali; Cathy Masajjage; Herbert Kibirige
- Release date: August 8, 2010 (Maisha Film Festival)
- Country: Uganda
- Language: English

A Good Catholic Girl is a 2010 Ugandan short film about a Muslim girl's attraction to someone from a different religious affiliation. It was written, produced and directed by Matt Bish. Matthew Nabwiso won the Best Supporting actor award at the 2013 Africa Magic Viewers Choice Awards for playing "Ahmed" in the film.

== Plot ==
Ahmed (a villainous butcher played by Matthew Nabwiso) is interested in a strict Muslim customer's daughter yet she loves someone else, a lowly carpenter (role played by Joel Okuyo Atiku Prynce) who isn't Muslim, which is forbidden (Haram) in their religion. Ahmed tries to rape her, and when she resists, he kills her. But, her lover avenges her.

== Cast ==
- Maureen Kulany as Amina
- Joel Okuyo Atiku as Carpenter
- Matthew Nabwiso as Ahmed
- Brenda Ibarah as Madina
- Tibba Murungi as Amina's Friend
- Sharon Amali as Amina's Friend
- Cathy Masajjage as Mother
- Herbert Kibirige as Father

== Reception ==
The controversial film questions some Islamic ideologies and portrays religious tensions. It was included in Africa First: Volume Two, an anthology of five short films from new African filmmakers. Nabwiso scooped the Best Supporting Actor - Drama Award at the inaugural Africa Magic Viewers' Choice Awards (AMVCA) in Lagos, Nigeria in March 2013 beating four challengers: three Nigerians Osita Iheme, Fabian Adeoye Lojede and Kalu Ikeagwu plus South African Thomas Gumede. He was the only Ugandan nominee in the 26 category competition.
