= Wakaliwood =

Ugandan film studio

- Industry: Entertainment
- Founded: 2005
- Founders: Nabwana I.G.G. Alan Hofmanis
- Headquarters: Kampala, Uganda
- Area served: Worldwide
- Key people: Nabwana I.G.G. Alan Hofmanis
- Products: Motion pictures
- Website: wakaliwood.com

Wakaliwood also known as Ramon Film Productions is a film studio based in Wakaliga, a slum in Uganda's capital of Kampala. Its founder and director is Isaac Godfrey Geoffrey Nabwana, a.k.a. Nabwana I.G.G., who has been called Uganda's Quentin Tarantino, after the gratuitous violence in his films. Wakaliwood is best known for its ultra-low budget (estimated to be in the region of $200) action movies, such as Who Killed Captain Alex?, Bad Black, Tebaatusasula, and the upcoming crowdsourced film Tebaatusasula: Ebola.

== History ==
Isaac Nabwana spent his childhood during the regime of Idi Amin in the 1970s. While the rest of Uganda was stricken with violence and ethnic cleansing, the farmland that Nabwana's grandfather owned was relatively peaceful. His inspirations for filmmaking came from reruns of Hawaii Five-O and Logan's Run, as well as his love of Hollywood action movies and martial arts films from his childhood. As he had never been in a theatre, he relied mostly on his brothers and friends' descriptions of films that were just released theatrically. In 2005, after taking a computer course on video editing and watching video tutorials on filmmaking, Nabwana founded Ramon Film Productions, naming it after his grandmothers, Rachael and Monica.

Alan Hofmanis, a film festival director based in New York City, traveled to Uganda after a friend who worked at an NGO showed him a trailer for Who Killed Captain Alex? on YouTube. After meeting Nabwana and producing a documentary on Ramon Film Productions, Hofmanis has since moved to Uganda to help promote Wakaliwood cinema worldwide. He was also given a starring role in Nabwana's 2016 film Bad Black and has been called "the first Mzungu Ugandan action movie star".

The studio makes props and jibs out of DIY parts, which commentators have compared to the early days of Hollywood. Among the studio's props is a full-sized helicopter frame that has become a staple in all Wakaliwood films. Nabwana shoots and edits his films using old computers that he assembles. Squibs and theatrical blood, used to simulate bloody gunshots, are made from condoms filled with red food coloring and tied to fishing lines before being taped to the actors' chests. Nabwana had previously used cow blood, but was forced to discontinue its use after one of his actors developed brucellosis.

Upon a film's completion, the actors sell DVD copies door-to-door in a one-week time window to ensure they make money before the film is bootlegged.

In Uganda, audiences go to video halls where VJs narrate over a feature film, translating the dialogue and adding their own commentary – making low budget films with VJ commentary like cult films.

On 2 March 2015, Wakaliwood set up a Kickstarter campaign to raise US$160 for the film Tebaatusasula: Ebola. The studio was able to receive over US$13,000 from 374 backers by 1 April. Tebaatusasula: Ebola serves as the direct sequel to Who Killed Captain Alex? and a remake of the 2010 film Tebaatusasula, which was lost after a massive power surge destroyed the hard drive that contained the film. In September of that year, the Wakaliwood crew attended the Nyege Nyege Festival in Jinja and spent two days shooting Attack on Nyege Nyege with the festival attendees as extras.

Bad Black was a critical and audience favorite at the Seattle International Film Festival in 2017. The film earned an encore presentation on the last day of the festival, with the film being screened a total of four times throughout the festival. The Seattle audience question and answer session with the director was conducted over Skype.

In 2019, for the project by French artist Louis-Cyprien Rials, as part of the SAM Prize for Contemporary Art, they produced a remake of Akira Kurosawa's Japanese film Rashomon entitled Boda-Boda Killer (Trashomon) for Au bord de la route de Wakaliga exhibition at the Palais de Tokyo in Paris.

In 2020, Wakaliwood collaborated with German melodic death metal band Heaven Shall Burn to direct the music video for "Eradicate", from their album Of Truth and Sacrifice.

In 2026, Nabwana announced the passing of Kakule William, who played the titular character in Who Killed Captain Alex.

== Filmography ==
- Valentine: Satanic Day (2010)
- Tebaatusasula (2010, lost film)
- Who Killed Captain Alex? (2010)
- The Return of Uncle Benon (2011)
- Rescue Team (2011)
- Bukunja Tekunja Mitti: The Cannibals (2012)
- Black: The Most C.I.D. Wanted (2012)
- Crazy World (Ani Mulalu) (2014)
- Bukunja Tekunja Mitti: The Cannibals (2015)
- The Revenge (2015)
- Ejjini Lye Ntwetwe (2015)
- Attack on Nyege Nyege Island (2016)
- Bad Black (2016)
- Once a Soja (Agubiri The Gateman) (2017)
- The Ivory Trap (2017)
- Kapitano (2018)
- Crazy World (2019)
- Boda-Boda Killer (Trashomon) (2019)
- Heaven Shall Burn - "Eradicate" (2020, music video)
- Kung Fu Brothers (2025)
- Rolex Time (2025)
- Eaten Alive in Uganda (2026)
- Operation Kakongoliro! The Ugandan Expendables (upcoming)
- Tebaatusasula: Ebola (upcoming)
- Revenge 2 (upcoming)
- Plan 9 From Uganda (working title)
- Benon (unknown date)
- Ejjini Kyaalo (unknown date)
- Juba: The Snake Girl (unknown date)
- Night Dancers: Fueled by Meat, Driven by Blood (unknown date)
- If America Was Uganda (unknown date)

== See also ==
- Cinema of Uganda
- Nabwana I.G.G.
