= Maisha Film Lab =

Uganda-based non-profit training film initiative

Maisha Film Lab is a Uganda-based non-profit training film initiative for emerging East African filmmakers and mentorship programme for aspiring filmmakers and youth in Eastern Africa. It encompasses film production, screenwriting, directing, producing, cinematography, editing, sound recording, and acting.

== Origins ==
Maisha was established in 2005 by film director Mira Nair. The name Maisha is from a Swahili word that means "life". Maisha aims to seek, identify, nurture, and promote creative talent among children and youth through hands-on skills development programmes in areas such as journalism, film-making, arts appreciation, and organisation and presentation of cultural and creative events.

== Notable alumni ==
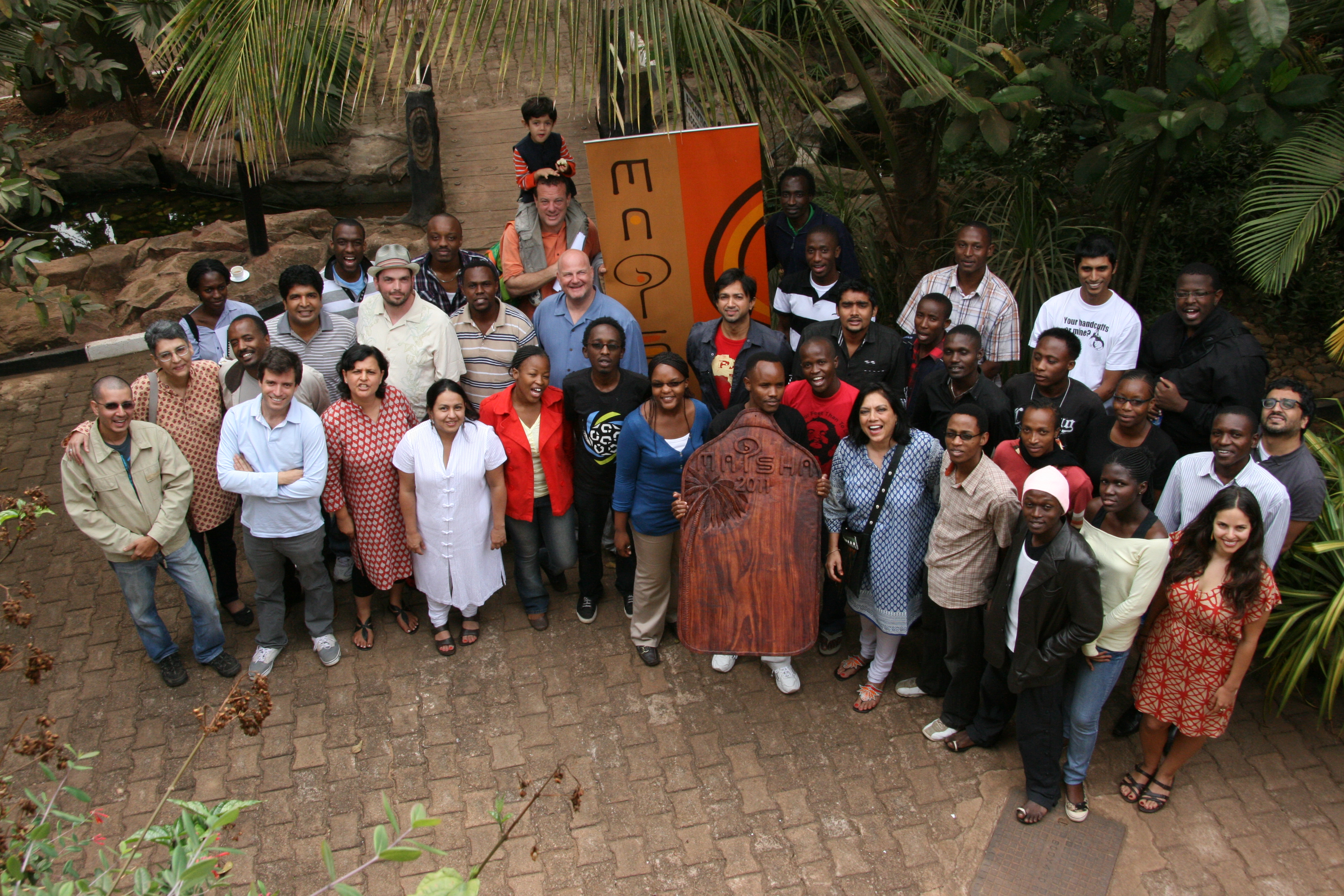
Maisha 2011 participants and Mentors

Below is a list of distinguished Maisha Film Lab alumni:

- Dilman Dila
- Joel Karekezi
- Lupita Nyong'o
- Mariam Ndagire
- Rehema Nanfuka
- Philbert Aime Mbabazi
- Usama Mukwaya
- Samuel Ishimwe
