= Nabwana I.G.G. =

Ugandan filmmaker and producer

Nabwana I.G.G. Director
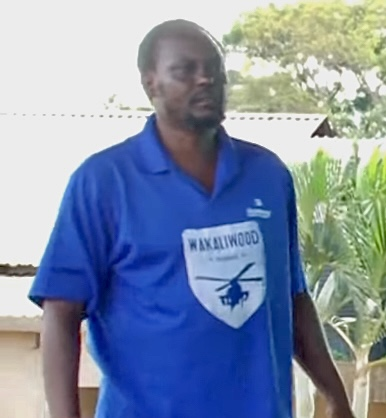
- Nabwana I.G.G. in 2019
- Born: Isaac Godfrey Geoffrey Nabwana; 6 November 1973 (age 52); Kampala, Uganda
- Citizenship: Uganda
- Occupations: Director, producer, writer, cinematographer, actor
- Years active: 2005–present
- Known for: Who Killed Captain Alex
- Notable work: Who Killed Captain Alex? Bad Black
- Spouse: Harriet Nabwana
- Children: 3

Isaac Godfrey Geoffrey Nabwana (born 6 November 1973), popularly known as Nabwana I.G.G., is a Ugandan film director, cinematographer, writer and producer. He is the founder of the film studio Wakaliwood, known for producing popular ultra-low budget action comedy films. He has been compared to Quentin Tarantino due to his use of gratuitous, over-the-top violence. Nabwana first started to gain wide international attention after uploading a trailer of Who Killed Captain Alex? on YouTube in 2010 followed by the entire film in 2015. The film has gained a cult status and as of February 2026, has 10.2 million views on YouTube. He is the subject of a 2022 documentary Once Upon a Time in Uganda by Cathryne Czubek.

== Personal life ==
Nabwana was born in Wakaliga, a village in the Rubaga parish of Kampala, as one of 42 children to a Baganda family. He spent his childhood in poverty under the regime of Idi Amin and later amidst the Ugandan Bush War. His grandfather was killed by Amin's followers. While playing around the neighbourhood, Nabwana and his friends often scavenged a garbage dump, where they sometimes found martial arts manuals, through which they developed an affinity for Chinese Kung Fu. His elder brothers often snuck out to visit video halls, which were communal cinemas, typically a single room with a television. While Nabwana never accompanied his brothers to the screenings on advice of his grandmother, he always listened to his brothers describing what they saw, mostly action films starring Chuck Norris, Bud Spencer, and Bruce Lee. In director commentary for Who Killed Captain Alex?, Nabwana recalls an incident during the civil war in which he and his brother were reportedly chased by an attack helicopter, which inspired a similar scene featuring a "Supa Choppa" in the movie.

As a child, Nabwana shovelled sand as a job to pay for school. In his teenage years, he took up menial work, including welding, painting, and pottery, working in these fields between the ages of 18 and 28 in hopes of being able to afford university tuition. He met his wife Harriet when he was around 30, after which he bought a property in Wakaliga and built a two-room house using terra rossa bricks he burned himself.

== Career ==
As he had never been in a theatre, he relied mostly on his brothers and friends' descriptions of films that were just released theatrically. He went for a course in computer repair, but was forced to drop out after the first month due to lack of funds. Therefore, he started to learn filmmaking and its aspects in a self learning methods with his own trial-and-error experiences with cameras and editing equipment. At the age of 32, following his wife's pregnancy with their first child, he began filmmaking as a profession. In 2005, Nabwana founded Ramon Film Productions: the name derived from his grandmothers, Rachel and Monica, which is later known as Wakaliwood.

His film production is based in his home where he began to produce and shoot music videos since 2009. Ramon Production has involved over 44 feature films. Some of the popular films produced by Ramon Productions are Who Killed Captain Alex?, Bad Black, and Tebaatusasula. Who Killed Captain Alex is credited as the first action film in Ugandan cinema.

After releasing Who Killed Captain Alex? in 2010, it quickly developed a cult following. The version of the film released online featured the first English-language video joker (locally famous VJ Emmie), who provides a comedic commentary track over the Luganda-language film, aiding its accessibility to foreign audiences. In 2016, a Kickstarter crowdfund was launched with a goal of US$160, ultimately raising $13,000. With over 10 million views on YouTube, it is Nabwana's most popular film and it turned him into a minor celebrity. Nabwana is frequently contacted and visited in person by foreign tourists, which boosts Wakaliga's local economy. Some visitors are allowed to act in Nabwana's film projects as extras that get killed on-screen. In 2020, a street in Kampala was named "Wakaliwood Lane" after Nabwana's company.

Alan Hofmanis, a film festival director based in New York City, saw the film and subsequently traveled to Uganda and met Nabwana and asked to produce a documentary on Ramon Film Productions. Hofmanis has since moved to Uganda to help promote Wakaliwood cinema worldwide and is now an executive producer and actor at Wakaliwood. He was also given a starring role in Nabwana's 2016 film Bad Black and has been called "the first Mzungu Ugandan action movie star."

In 2025, Nabwana worked with The Renaissance Society to host an eight-week exhibition at the University of Chicago between 1 March and 27 April, featuring the premiere of Nabwana's first satirical film, If Uganda was America, along with photographic art and screenings of Nabwana's other works.

== Awards ==
In 2016, Nabwana won the audience award and Best Action Director award at Fantastic Fest for Bad Black. In 2017, Nabwana was named Best Director at Fantastic Planet Film Festival for Bad Black, sharing the award with Best Film winner Mathieu Turi for Hostile. In 2021, he received the Grand Jury Prize at DOC NYC for the film Once Upon a Time in Uganda.

== Filmmaking style and themes ==
Nabwana shoots his films in Luganda, the language of the Baganda, Uganda's largest ethnic group. Nabwana is known for his action and violence mixed in with comedy in his films. He takes the action in his films to new extremes which mainly consists of gun fighting to Kung-fu and martial arts. Additionally, Nabwana's films feature a 'Video Joker' (or VJ for short), who will translate dialogue and insert their own jokes and commentary over the movie. These traits have appeared in all of Nabwana's films.

Nabwana's film budget was previously around US$200, which he used to produce several projects within a single day. As of 2024, the average budget had increased to $1000, in part due to higher overall costs following the COVID-19 pandemic. Actors do not have a fixed fee, but receive a portion of the film earnings, with Nabwana also paying for transport, food, and boarding.

== Filmography ==
Year	Film	Role	Genre	Ref.	Notes
2008	Ekisa Butwa	Director, producer, writer, cinematographer	Film		First film
2010	Valentine: Satanic Day	Director, producer, writer, cinematographer	Film		
2010	Who Killed Captain Alex?	Director, producer, writer, cinematographer	Film		Breakthrough film
2010	Tebaatusasula	Director, producer, writer, cinematographer	Film		lost film
2011	The Return of Uncle Benon	Director, producer, writer, cinematographer	Film		
2011	Rescue Team	Director, producer, writer, cinematographer	Film		
2012	Bukunja Tekunja Mitti: The Cannibals	Director, producer, writer, cinematographer	Film		
2012	Black	Director, producer, writer, cinematographer	Film		
2014	Crazy World	Director, producer, actor, writer, cinematographer	Film		First acting role
2015	The Revenge	Director, producer, writer, cinematographer	Film		
2016	The Ivory Trap: Akanawuusu	Director, producer, writer, cinematographer	Film		
2016	Once a Soja: Agubiri the Gateman	Director, producer, writer, cinematographer	Film		
2016	Million Dollar Kid	Director, producer, writer, cinematographer	Film		
2016	Kapitano	Director, producer, writer, cinematographer	Film		
2016	Attack on Nyege Nyege Island	Director, producer, writer, cinematographer	Short film		
2016	Bad Black	Director, producer, writer, cinematographer	Film		
2020	Heaven Shall Burn	Director, producer, writer, cinematographer	Music Video		
2021	Once Upon a Time in Uganda	Actor	Documentary		
2021	Kung Fu Brothers	Director, producer, writer, cinematographer	Film		
2021	Abaana ba Mzee Chansi	Director, producer, writer, cinematographer	Film		
2022	Isaak Ninja	Director, producer, writer, cinematographer	Film		
2023	Kampala Afunda	Director, producer, writer, cinematographer	Film		
2023	Ekyaapa	Director, producer, writer, cinematographer	Film		
2023	Kino Kimenke	Director, producer, writer, cinematographer	Film		
2023	Struggle	Director, producer, writer, cinematographer	Film		
2023	Katonda Y'amanyi	Director, producer, writer, cinematographer	Film		
2024	Operation Wakaliga: Fate and Blood	Director, producer, writer, cinematographer	Film		
2025	If Uganda was America	Director, producer, writer, cinematographer	Film		
2025	Rolex Time	Director, producer, writer, cinematographer	Film		
TBD	Operation Kakongoliro! The Ugandan Expendables	Director, producer, writer, cinematographer	Film		
TBD	Eaten Alive in Uganda	Director, producer, writer, cinematographer	Film		
TBD	Ebola Hunter	Director, producer, writer, cinematographer	Film		
TBD	Who Killed Captain Alex 2	Director, producer, writer, cinematographer	Film		

== See also ==
- Michael Wawuyo Jr
- Matt Bish
