= From a Whisper =

- Directed by: Wanuri Kahiu
- Written by: Wanuri Kahiu
- Screenplay by: Wanuri Kahiu
- Produced by: Kuxi Ghai
- Starring: Ken Ambani; Abubakar Mwenda; Godfrey Odhiambo; Corine Onyango
- Cinematography: Marius van Graan
- Edited by: Christopher King
- Music by: Eric Wainaina
- Release date: 12 September 2008 (Kenya)
- Running time: 79 minutes
- Country: Kenya
- Language: English

From a Whisper is a Kenyan drama film written and directed by Africa Movie Academy Award winner Wanuri Kahiu. The film received 12 nominations and won 5 awards at the Africa Movie Academy Awards in 2009, including Best Picture, Best Original Soundtrack, Best Director, Best Original Screenplay and AMAA Achievement in Editing. The film also won the Best Feature Narrative award at the 2010 Pan African Film & Arts Festival, and was honored with the 2010 BAFTA/LA Festival Choice Prize. Although the film commemorates the 10th anniversary of the 7 August terrorist bombing in Kenya in 1998, it is not about the terrorist bombing. The movie portrays a realistic story of the aftermath of the bombing by capturing the lives of the victims and their families who had to pick up the pieces of their lives shredded by the blast.

== Synopsis ==
From a Whisper is based on the real events surrounding the 7 August bomb attacks on the US Embassy in Nairobi in 1998. Abu is an intelligence officer who keeps to himself. When he meets Tamani, a young, rebellious artist in search of her mother, he decides to help. The discovery of her death churns up memories of Fareed, Abu's best friend who also lost his life in the attack. The discovery forces them to learn how to forgive, to believe in themselves, and confront what they fear the most – the truth.

== Cast ==
- Ken Ambani as Abu
- Abubakar Mwenda as Fareed
- Godfrey Odhiambo as Tamani's Father
- Corine Onyango as Tamani
- Samara Migwi
- Tariqa Ismail
- Nagib Khan
- Musa Mohamed
- Lydia Gitachu

== Awards ==
- Festival Internacional de Zanzíbar 2009
- Festival Internacional de Kenya 2009
- Africa Movie Academy Awards 2010
- 1st Kalasha International Film & TV awards
