= Papi (2018 film) =

Papi (film)
- Directed by: Kjell Clarysse
- Starring: Papy Tshifuaka; Deedan Muyira; Rehema Nanfuka; Felix Bwanika; Daniel Omara
- Music by: Black Coyote
- Release date: February 2018
- Countries: Belgium, Uganda
- Languages: English, French

Papi is Belgian-French-Ugandan film that was written and directed by Belgian writer and director Kjell Clarysse. The film was shot on a shoestring budget of $15,000 (about Shs 54.5m) on location in Kampala, Belgium and France in 2015 but still got a successful premier in Belgium in 2017. It premiered in Uganda in February 2018.

== Plot ==
In Kampala, a Congolese boda boda rider's life is changed for the worst when he meets a vengeful Ugandan girl seeking justice for her murdered mother and a European expatriate.

== Cast ==
The cast is led by Belgian-based Congolese actor Papy Tshifuaka and joined by Ugandan actors including Rehema Nanfuka, Deedan Muyira, Daniel Omara, Felix Bwanika and Wilberforce Mutete.
