= Simon Hansen (filmmaker) =

South African filmmaker

- Citizenship: South Africa
- Occupation: Filmmaker
- Known for: Alive in Joburg

Simon Hansen is a South African filmmaker best known for Alive in Joburg, which the film District 9 was later based on.

== Background ==
Hansen and Sharlto Copley supplied ETV (Emery Telecom) with a show called Deadtime which ran during the 'dead time' for midnight to 6 a.m.

== Partnerships and associates ==
Hansen has worked closely with Copley, Amira Quinlan, and Hannah Slezacek on most of his projects. Hansen directed and produced two short films, 2001: a Space Oddity and Hellweek, both of which were featured at the 2006 Cannes Film Festival, regarded as cinéma du monde.

Hansen's first feature film, Spoon, was co-directed by Copley in 2006, produced by Hansen, Quinlan, and Copley, starring Darren Boyd and Rutger Hauer. Copley left Hansen to finish the project after when he was offered the lead role of Wikus Van Der Merwe in District 9. Spoon was released in 2011. Hansen helped in the development of the "SI-2K", which was used for the first time on Spoon and later on Slumdog Millionaire, which won an Academy Award for cinematography.

In 2005, Hanson and Sharlto produced a short film directed by Neill Blomkamp entitled Alive in Joburg. The film features a documentary style account of aliens living in South African townships and is the basis for the 2009 film District 9, in which Copley starred. Hansen also directed the second unit in District 9.

In 2009, Hansen produced Pumzi, a short film which featured a future sci-fi world without water, 35 years after the fictional "Water War". Pumzi (Swahili for "breath") was written and directed by Kenyan director, Wanuri Kahiu. The short film is part of the Focus Features backed Africa First Program and was officially in competition at Sundance 2010.

== Visual effects ==
Hansen's company, Atomic Visual Effects, has produced 3D animation and visual effects for Spoon, What the Bleep do We (k)now, The Breed, Pumzi, and Chronicle. Hansen also supervised the visual effects on Lost City Raiders, and the TV series Crusoe.
