= Do You Believe in Magic (film) =

Do You Believe in Magic?
- Starring: Magic Johnson
- Release date: 2008
- Country: United States

Do You Believe in Magic? is a 2008 American documentary on Magic Johnson, which received the Best Documentary award at the 4th Africa Movie Academy Awards.
