= Imani (film) =

- Directed by: Caroline Kamya
- Screenplay by: Agnes Nasozi Kamya
- Produced by: iVAD International Ltd Cinepost Studios Filmpool Nord Liudbang Rode Orm Film
- Starring: Ocen Stephen; Rehema Nanfuka; Philip Buyi Roy
- Cinematography: Andrew Mark Coppin
- Edited by: Carolina Kamya
- Music by: Ragnar Grippe
- Release date: 2010
- Running time: 82 minutes
- Countries: Sweden; Uganda

Imani
- Directed by: Caroline Kamya
- Screenplay by: Agnes Nasozi Kamya
- Produced by: iVAD International Ltd Cinepost Studios Filmpool Nord Liudbang Rode Orm Film
- Starring: Ocen Stephen; Rehema Nanfuka; Philip Buyi Roy; Stephen Odong; Rehema Nanfuka; Michael Wawuyo
- Cinematography: Andrew Mark Coppin
- Edited by: Carolina Kamya; Ben Nugent
- Music by: Ragnar Grippe
- Release date: 15 February 2010 (Berlinale)
- Running time: 82 minutes
- Countries: Sweden; Uganda
- Languages: Acholi, English, Luganda

Imani is a 2010 Swedish-Ugandan film by Caroline Kamya.

== Synopsis ==
The film takes place during a normal day in the Ugandan capital Kampala. For three people however, this will be no ordinary one. Mary, who works in the house of an upper class lady, faces serious difficulties when she has no choice but to pay a bribe to save her sister from the clutches of the police. 12-year-old Olweny, a former child soldier, leaves the rehabilitation center to return to his parents' village, destroyed by the war. And break-dancer Armstrong has to put together a performance due to take place that same evening.

Imani's UK television premiere was on The Africa Channel International (Sky 209 & Virgin Media 828) on Wednesday 20 February 2013.
