= Jayant Maru =

Kenyan film director (born 1990)

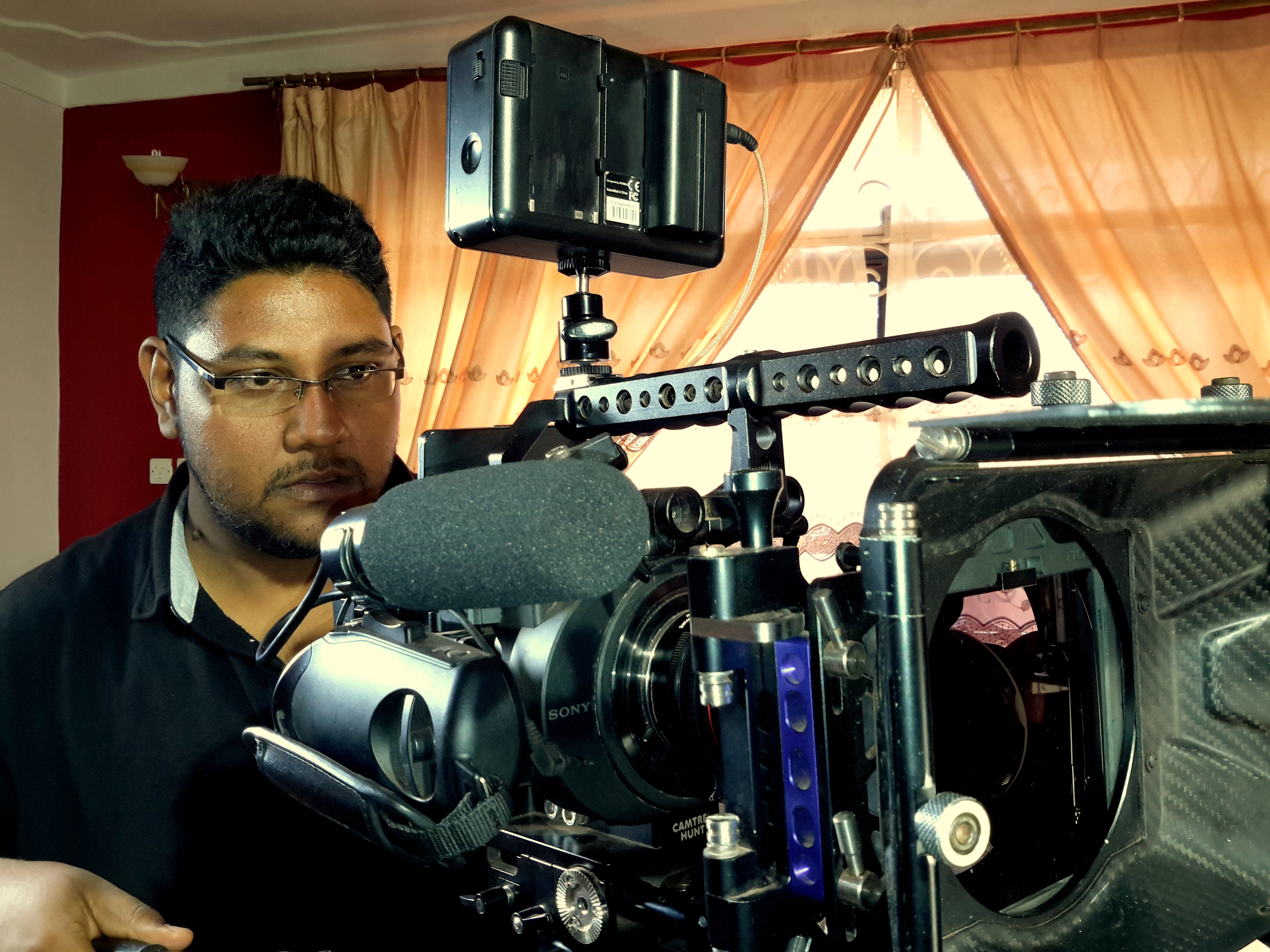
- Maru in 2015
- Born: Jayant Maru; 13 June 1990 (age 36); Nairobi, Kenya
- Occupations: Director, producer, actor
- Employer: MAHJ PRODUCTIONS
- Notable work: The Route, Sipi, K3NT & KAT3
- Website: www.mahjproductions.com

Jayant Maru is a Kenyan filmmaker based in Uganda. His directorial credits include The Route, K3NT & KAT3, and Sipi. He has worked with Olympian Stephen Kiprotich, Miss Uganda 2014 Leah Kalanguka, and actor Patriq Nkakalukanyi.

== Filmography ==
| Year | Film | Role | Notes |
|---|---|---|---|
| 2013 | The Route | Writer, director, producer | 91 Minutes, commonly referred to as 'Uganda's First Human Rights Campaign Feature Film against Human Trafficking'; Official Selection: Nominated Best Feature Film : Uganda Film Festival 2013, Nominated Best Feature Film : Silicon Valley African Film Festival 2013, Official Selection : Manya Human Rights Film Festival 2013, WINNER Best Feature Film : Nile Diaspora International Film Festival 2013, Nominated Best Feature Film : FESTICAB Burundi Film Festival 2014, WINNER Best Feature Film : Mashariki African Film Festival 2015, Nominated Best Diaspora Feature Film : KALASHA Awards 2014. |
| 2014 | K3NT & KAT3 | Director, producer | 101 Minutes; Official Selection: Nominated for best Feature Film at the Silicon Valley African Film Festival 2015, Nominated for Best Feature Film Arusha African Film Festival 2015. |
| 2016 | Sipi (film) | Director | Currently in Post Production. |
