= Matt Bish =

Ugandan filmmaker

- Born: 15 May 1975 (age 51); Uganda
- Education: Makerere University
- Occupations: Filmmaker and creative director

Matt Bish (born 15 May 1975), also known as Matthew Bishanga, is an Ugandan filmmaker and the Creative Director at Bish Films. He directed the first Ugawood feature film, Battle of the Souls, in 2007.

See Also: Brian Muhumuza Bishanga

== Personal life and education ==
The first of four children born to Mr. and Mrs. Douglas Bishanga, Bish obtained his early education in Uganda. There, as a boy, he grew to love film, attending the cinema but also being exposed to many movies at home with his family on his father's home video system. He credits his parents with inspiring his film career. After his primary education, he attended Makerere University in Kampala, where he studied architecture, before moving to the Netherlands in 1998 and studying digital filmmaking at the SAE Institute in Amsterdam.

== Career ==
In 2005, Bish returned to Uganda to start an audiovisual production company "Bish Films Ltd" with his younger brother Roger Mugisha. At first limited to music videos, it soon branched out into films. Bish worked on his first feature film in 2006. Battle of the Souls is the first feature film in Uganda.

Bish Films produces TV commercials and documentaries, as well as films and music videos as they did when they first began. He believes Ugandan films that try to maintain quality should not be categorised as kina-Uganda (like ki-Nigeria) but rather Nile Films, Ugawood or something else.

"A critic is someone who can't do what you do the way you do it..." - Matt Bish

== Filmography ==
Year	Film	Role	Notes
2007	Battle of the Souls	Writer, director, producer	105 Minutes, commonly referred to as 'Uganda's First Feature Film'; Official Selection: Kenya International Film Festival, Zanzibar International Film Festival, Verona International Film Festival, Pan African Film Festival (Los Angeles), Africa Movie Academy Awards (11 nominations, Won Best Visual Effects and Best Supporting Actor), Special Mention for Best African Film (KIFF, ZIFF, VIFF)
2011	State Research Bureau	Director, producer	95 Minutes; Official Selection: African Film Festival Lagos (Nigeria), ZIFF, AMAA (2 nominations), KIFF, Pearl International Film Festival (7 nominations), Africa in the Picture International Film Festival Amsterdam 2012 (Winner Best Ugandan Feature Film, Cinematography, Producer, Screenplay and actor Awards at PIFF, Kampala)
2014	The Sircle	Director	60 Minutes for M-Net Africa Magic Channel
2014	Playboy	Director	60 Minutes for M-Net Africa Magic Channel
2014	No Lie	Director	60 Minutes for M-Net Africa Magic Channel

Short films

Year	Title	Role	Notes
2010	A Good Catholic Girl	Writer, director, producer	26 Minutes, with the support of Focus Features in its Africa First Program; Official Selection: KIFF, ZIFF, VIFF 2011
2012	Cut That Thing	Director, producer	14 Minutes, produced for Z.O.A.; Official Selection: Interfilm Berlin International Short Film Festival 2012, Kenya International Film Festival

Documentaries

Year	Documentary	Role	Notes
2005	Vote National Resistance Movement	Director, producer	5 Minutes, produced for Mary Kiseka
2005	The Journey of KMCC	Director, producer	26 Minutes, for Kansanga Mirale Centre Church
2006	Celtel Uganda	Director, producer	9 Minutes
2011	No Water No School	Director, producer	3 Minutes, for UNHCR
2011	Picking Up The Pieces	Director, producer	4 Minutes, produced for UNHCR
2011	Restoring Dignity	Director, producer	3 Minutes, for UNHCR; Official Selection: Kenya International Film Festival 2011
2011	Returning Home	Director, producer	5 Minutes, for UNHCR; Official Selection: Kenya International Film Festival 2011
2011	The Struggle To Live A Dignifying Life	Director, producer	14 Minutes, produced for HelpAge International

== See also ==
- Nabwana I.G.G.
- Michael Wawuyo Jr
