= State Research Bureau (film) =

- Film poster
- Directed by: Matt Bish
- Starring: Roger Masaba; Bwanika Baale Felix; Joel Okuyo Atiku; Cleopatra Koheirwe; Matthew Nabwiso; Roger Mugisha; Mathew Nabwiso
- Release date: January 25, 2011
- Country: Uganda
- Language: English

State Research Bureau, also marketed as S.R.B., is a Ugandan action film directed by Matt Bish. It's a story based on Uganda's dark past and exposes the brutality of the President's secret intelligence police that ran safe houses.

== Plot ==
Before 1986, a family tries to flee the troubled country, but are intercepted by state operatives. They meet the notorious Captain Yusuf who runs a safe house (prison). It's the 1980s, but Yusuf's unit reflects the State Research Bureau during the 1970s.

== Cast ==
S.R.B. featured Roger Masaba as the notorious intelligence chief, Joel Okuyo Atiku as James, Cleopatra Koheirwe and Matthew Nabwiso. Also making an appearance is Roger Mugisha, the inspiration for Matt Bish's first film Battle of the Souls in which Okuyo and Nabwiso had starred back in 2007.

== Release and reception ==
The film premiered in Kansanga, a suburb of Kampala, Uganda at Wonder World (former Didi's World) on 25 January 2011, the 32nd Anniversary since Idi Amin's Overthrow by Tanzanian armed forces plus Ugandan exiles and an evening just before the 25th Anniversary of the National Resistance Movement's Liberation Day.

In 2013, it swept the inaugural Uganda Film Festival Awards organised by the Uganda Communications Commission (UCC), winning in four categories.

One unforgettable line in the movie, though sarcastic, is: "Welcome to Hotel Arua, hahaha!" Although shot mainly in Jinja, Uganda, it was inspired by the stories of real life survivors of the era. The movie starts in Arua where innocent civilians are gunned down, reminiscent of the Ombaci Massacre during the Obote II regime.

== See also ==
- 8th Africa Movie Academy Awards
- Africa Movie Academy Award for Best Visual Effects

State Research Bureau *Cinema of Uganda
