= Wanuri Kahiu =

Kenyan filmmaker (born 1980)

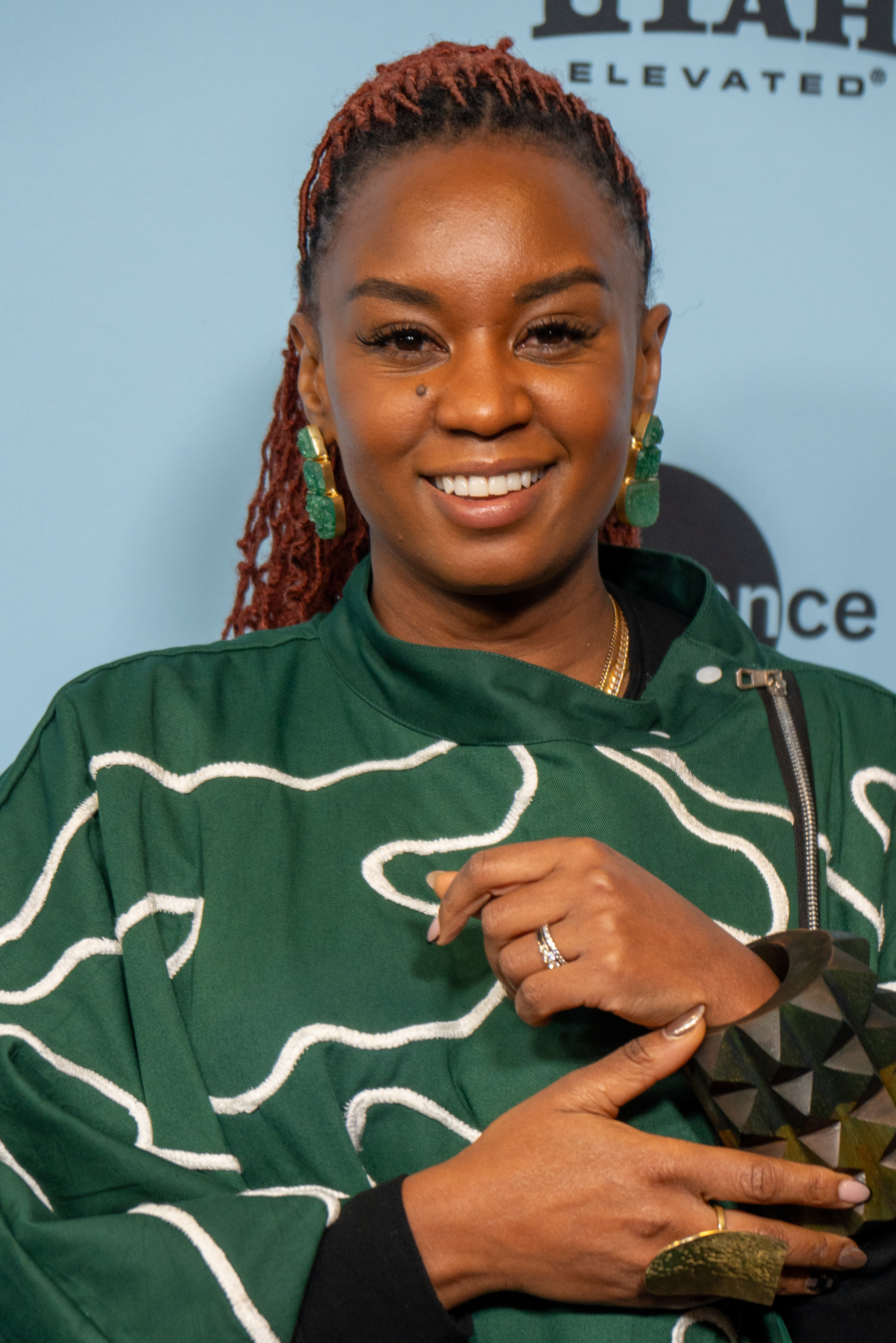
- Kahiu at the 2025 Sundance Film Festival
- Born: 21 June 1980 (age 46); Nairobi, Kenya
- Education: University of Warwick; University of California, Los Angeles
- Occupation: Filmmaker
- Notable work: From a Whisper (2008); Pumzi (2009); Rafiki (2018)

Wanuri Kahiū (born 21 June 1980) is a Kenyan film director, producer, and author. She is considered to be "one of Africa's most aspiring directors, being part of a new, vibrant crop of talents representing contemporary African culture". She has received multiple awards and nominations including for Best Director, Best Screenplay and Best Picture at the Africa Movie Academy Awards in 2009 for her dramatic feature film From a Whisper. She is also the co-founder of AFROBUBBLEGUM, a media collective dedicated to supporting African art for its own sake.

As of 2023, Kahiū was reported to be living in Kenya.

In 2025, Kahiū served as a juror at the Sundance Film Festival's World Cinema Dramatic competition category, alongside Ava Cahen and Daniel Kaluuya.

== Early life and education ==
Kahiū was born in Nairobi, Kenya. Though she grew up in an extended family that included creatives, the filmmaker described herself as a black sheep to her more traditional leaning parents: her father, a businessman and her mother a doctor, one of the first female pediatricians in the Nairobi region.

Kahiū first became enamored with filmmaking when exposed to an editing studio when she was sixteen. "When I entered that editing suite I fell in love. It aligned my two passions; which is being a tele addict and being a bookworm and anything that would allow me to maintain that space and call it a career was for me."

Kahiū attended the University of Warwick in England and received a BSc degree in Management science. In 2001, she obtained a Master of Fine Arts degree in production and directing at the University of California, Los Angeles School of Theatre, Film and Television.

== Career ==
In 2003, Kahiū began her filmmaking career interning for the American director and producer F. Gary Gray's on The Italian Job. As she explains, Gray taught her to "keep an eye on the bigger picture but not to take the details for granted". In 2006, Kahiu made her directing debut with the behind-the-scenes documentary The Spark that Unites about the making of Catch a Fire directed by Phillip Noyce. Becoming close friends with Kahiu, Noyce encouraged her to go back to her home country to tell Kenyan stories.

=== Ras Star ===
Ras Star (2006) is Kahiū's first short narrative film. It tells the story of Amani, a teenager living with his Islamic aunt and uncle in Nairobi who dreams of being a rapper, and secretly practices for a local talent show. Instead, he and his brother get pulled into crime.

=== From a Whisper ===
Her first feature film, From a Whisper (2008), received a total of 12 nominations and earned five awards at the 5th Africa Movie Academy Awards in 2009. Among other nominations, the film was nominated for the Best Picture Award, Best Screenplay Award, and Best Director Award. It ended up winning in all three categories. The film fictionalizes the terrorist attack on the U.S. Embassy in Nairobi in 1998. It tells the story of a young girl, Tamani, who loses her mother in the attack and is told by her father that her mother is missing when she is actually deceased. Tamani searches for her mother, painting hearts across the city, she also befriends a policeman named Abu. Abu helps Tamani as the viewers discover the shame he feels for not stopping his friend who helped attack the embassy.

As Dennis Harvey writes in his review for the Daily Variety, the "interactions between the young woman and older man let both come to terms with a painful past they were helpless to prevent". Film scholar, Clara Giruzzi highlights Kahiū's display of an African feminist sensibility, displayed by the egalitarian relationships in the film, and the pacifist messages in the wake of national trauma, which challenge essentialist and universalist western perspectives of Africa. Dennis Harvey, for the Daily Variety, writes that despite the film's occasional "titled" writing and performances, the drama "effectively puts the causes and aftermath of large terrorist actions in personal terms."

As she notes in an interview, Kahiū still remembers the event, despite being a young teenager at the time. She refers to the bombing as "a horrific and traumatic event from Kenya". She remembers her mother treating several patients who were the victims of the bombing. Although the event itself was a tragedy, Kahiū notes that it united Kenyans, regardless of their "ethnicity, social status or tribe". When talking about the pre-production process for From a Whisper, Kahiu notes that casting for the role of Tamani, one of the protagonists of the story, took months before she met Corrine Onyango, who ended up getting the role. Although the film was Onyango's debut, Kahiū stated that she was "the perfect fit" and "did an amazing job with the character".

=== Pumzi ===
According to literature scholar Mich Nyawalo, Pumzi (2009) challenges the pessimistic representation of African realities and futures by using the aesthetics of Africanfuturism to demonstrate African-led creativity. It depicts the story of a young botanist Asha, thirty five years after World War III (aka the water war). Asha discovers life outside of her post-apocalyptic underground community. In her protectionist community, members must take dream suppressants to quiet hopes of a better future.

Pumzi premiered at the 2010 Sundance Film Festival as a part of the New African Cinema program. It won several awards, one of them being the Best Short Film Award at the Cannes Film Festival.

Mitch Nyawalo argues that Pumzi's destruction parallels the economic devastation in the aftermath of the World Bank's structural adjustment programs. The film also displays an "ecofemninst critical posture" where women are most affected by environment devastation but also are at the forefront of bettering their societies. Art scholar Omar Kholeif writes about Pumzi's interpellation of Western understandings of Africa: "Kahiu's film poses a poignant allegory in that it espouses an indirect commentary on imperial essentialism of the superficial Other. This is achieved by correlating the disenchantment that gave rise to science fiction with the perceived notions of Africa as a barren and impoverished social and geographic entity." Aboubakar Sanogo, a scholar and professor, describes Pumzi as "post-nature", a term that describes the relationship between humanity and the environment. African Studies scholar MaryEllen Higgins describes the film's "untraceable sound" suggesting "motion...without any visually perceivable movement" that "breaks the quiet stillness of a devastated, dead landscape". The sound, Higgins writes, is "strange" like an "approaching storm".

=== For Our Land ===
Kahiū's documentary For Our Land documents Nobel Peace Prize laureate Professor Wangari Maathai's story. Maathai's filmed biography takes part of a series "The Great Africans" for a South African television channel M-Net. The documentary gives voice to the professor's environmental and political activism. Although film critic, Kathryn Mara, criticizes some of the "unexplained chronological gaps", she notes that the film present the professor's legacy "in a lively and engaged manner". The documentary underscores the "relationship between European colonialism and environmental change" as well as the "intersectionalities" of battling over land with housing developments.

=== Rafiki ===
Kahiū's 2018 film Rafiki ("Friend") received funding by the Netherlands Film Fund. The production company is Big World Cinema, a South African company supporting young African filmmakers. In her interview with Olivier Barlet, Kahiū mentions working with Steven Markovitz, a South African producer, whom she also worked with on her short film Pumzi. She states that "having two people, from two different countries actually makes a project stronger" and helps "grow the industry on the Continent". The rest of the production team came from Kenya, France, and the Netherlands. Rafiki chronicles the story of two Kenyan girls who fall in love with each other and struggle to navigate this love with their families in a homophobic society. In an interview with Olivier Barlet, Kahiū says that she chose to adapt Ugandan author Monica Arac de Nyeko's short story "Jambula Tree", due to its "texture and nuances" in the taboo love story. Homosexuality in Africa has long been debated, but Kahiu tells Olivier Barlet that homophobia is not of the spirit of Ubuntu since it marginalizes people in the community. Above all, Kahiū finished her interview with Olivier Barlet by saying that she hopes the upcoming film will portray a "normal love story" that acknowledges the heroic challenges of choosing a "difficult love". In addition, Kahiū discusses in an NPR interview with Sacha Pfeiffer how her films are not necessarily meant to be political, how she does not create them for that purpose, but they are "deemed political" because of her race and gender. She goes on to lament how unfortunate it is "that sometimes that when two people are in love, the moment that you change the gender and the race of the people in love, it becomes increasingly political" and that is all audiences and critics tend to see.

Rafiki is the first feature film portraying a love story between two girls to ever come out of Kenya. The film tells a story about Kena and Ziki, two girls living in the same neighborhood, and the way their relationship develops despite the conservative environment they live in. Kena comes from a working-class family; her dad is a store owner who decided to run as a candidate in the local elections. Kena comes from a “broken” family with her dad separating from her mom and starting a family with a different woman. Ziki, on the other hand, has a different family background. As members of the upper middle class, her family has access to things Kena's family does not. Ziki's father, as the opposing candidate in the local elections, has an easier time with his campaign because of his financial state, while Kena's father has to rely on the support of the local people who come into his store.

As we watch Kena and Ziki's relationship blossom, we are constantly reminded of the surroundings they live in. Although the way they interact with each other and openly showcase their fondness for one another completely challenges heteronormativity, Kahiū juxtaposes that with the conservative, narrow-minded mindset of the people around them. In her interview with Olivier Barlet, Kahiū emphasizes the importance of the rejection of labels through her work, as a way of opposing the heteronormative world we live in. She states that she wants Rafiki to be a love story first, before being seen as a queer love story.

The film was selected to premiere at the 2018 Cannes Film Festival, and was the first Kenyan film to screen at the festival where it received a standing ovation. The film was nominated for the Queer Palm Award at the 2018 Cannes Film Festival. It was shown at the 2018 London Film Festival. In total, the film received 17 nominations and 17 awards at different international film festivals.

In a 2021 CNN interview, Kahiū stated that being a filmmaker in Kenya is "ridiculously difficult" because film is not "an appreciated art". Despite being an internationally acclaimed filmmaker, Kahiū still struggles to get recognition in her own country, due to her progressive way of thinking that contradicts societal norms. When talking about the production process for Rafiki, Kahiu stated that making a film in Kenya requires a license, which the Rafiki production team was able to obtain, despite the film's controversial topic. However, after the production had wrapped, the Classification Board required Kahiū to change the ending and make it "more remorseful", because they felt it was "too hopeful", in order to avoid having the film banned. Kahiū refused to change the ending, which resulted in the film being banned.

=== The Wooden Camel ===
The Wooden Camel is Kahiu's first children's book. It tells the story of a boy named Etabo, who dreams of racing camels. His older siblings tease him and his family sells their camels to survive. With the help of his goat friend and his spirits, who tell him his "dreams are enough", he continues to daydream. His sister then carves him a wooden camel, bringing Etabo closer to his family.

=== Rusties ===
Kahiū's co-written short story with Nnedi Okorafor, "RUSTIES", indulges a futuristic world. The story tells the story of the relationship between a young girl and a traffic-directing robots. In an interview with Quartz, Kahiu says that creating images for African children is important to correct "being written out of our histories" and to hope for a future Africa.

In June 2019, to mark the 50th anniversary of the Stonewall riots, an event widely considered a watershed moment in the modern LGBTQ rights movement, Queerty named her one of the Pride50 "trailblazing individuals who actively ensure society remains moving towards equality, acceptance and dignity for all queer people".

=== The Thing About Jellyfish film adaptation ===
In April 2019, Kahiū and Millie Bobby Brown teamed up for a film adaptation of the YA novel The Thing About Jellyfish for Universal Studios. Kahiū is set to direct the film, which will be produced by Gigi Pritzker and Rachel Shane of MWM Studios, Bruna Papandrea, and Reese Witherspoon.

The Thing About Jellyfish, written by Ali Benjamin, is a debut novel about grief and wonder, which became a New York Times bestseller.

=== Wild Seed film adaptation ===
Wanuri Kahiū is also among writers who will be working on the adaptation of Octavia Butler's novel Wild Seed into a film, in a project by Amazon.

Wanuri, who will also be director of the Wild Seed series, will develop the script alongside Nigerian author Nnedi Okorafor. The show is produced by Viola Davis and Julius Tennon of JuVee Production.

=== Once on This Island film adaptation ===
In July 2020, it was announced that Wanuri Kahiū would direct the film adaptation of the Stephen Flaherty-Lynn Ahrens stage musical Once on This Island for Walt Disney Pictures and Marc Platt Productions from a screenplay by Jocelyn Bioh. It will be released on Disney+.

== Creative influences ==
=== Africanfuturism ===
Kahiū engages with Africanfuturism, both in her artistic creation and as inspiration. Drawing on the depth, power, and histories of African mythologies, spiritualities, and naturalisms, Kahiū has made the argument that African peoples and cultures have been engaging in afrofuturistic thought for centuries, if not longer. Primarily, she locates Africa as relatively close to the spirit world, allowing for a blending of spirituality and reality both in story and in lived reality. She positions Africa as an inherently futuristic space, one that disrupts and does away with Western binaries surrounding technology, nature, and linear time. Africa's futurity is one far older, deeper, and richer than anything that the West has come up with. Contemporarily, Kahiū has identified Africanfuturism as one that undergoes a postcolonial reclamation of its own timelines, narratives, and spaces. This becomes apparent in Pumzi, in which reclamation and reuse are shown to be authentically, inherently African practices. Pumzi's celebration of an Afro-centric future criticizes Afro-pessimism. In Pumzi, Kahiū challenges the pessimistic representation of African realities and futures by using the aesthetics of Afrofutirism to demonstrate African-led creativity. Furthermore, in an interview with Variety, Kahiū says she enjoys the genre of sci-fi for its "flexibility" and "the ability to use metaphors to say a lot more challenging things about the politics or social climate in Africa."

In her 2014 "No More Labels" TED talk, Kahiū mentions that growing up in Kenya, she encountered few African love stories depicted in film, which also influenced some of her creative choices.

=== Critique of non-governmental organizations ===
Kahiū has critiqued the ways in which Non Governmental Organizations (NGOs) control the popular imagination of Africa. She has expressed that how you get money to be able to be a filmmaker in Kenya is through making films about whatever NGOs are funding – films that are about AIDS or female genital mutilation. These images, Kahiu says, reconstitute Africa as the Other.

Kahiū situates her work as a filmmaker making films about Africa to combat these images. She says her films are for the next generation: "Because we have children that we are bearing, and because there are people already here now who exist (my daughter exists now), that we are telling stories to: we need to be very clear about the messages we're putting out."

=== Ecology ===
In an interview with Vogue Italia, Kahiū says: "We have to be careful and sensitive, like in my film Pumzi we have to be the mother of mother nature and if we are not mother of mother nature than mother nature will stop mothering us."

== Filmography ==
Director

- 2006: The Spark That Unites
- 2006: Ras Star
- 2008: From a Whisper
- 2009: Pumzi
- 2009: For Our Land
- 2014: State House (4 episodes)
- 2018: Who Am I?
- 2018: Rafiki
- 2022: Look Both Ways
- TBA: The Thing About Jelly Fish
- TBA: Once on This Island
- TBA: Wild Seed
- TBA: The Black Kids

Producer

- 2005: 500 Years Later
- 2005: Still Life
- 2013: Homecoming

== Bibliography ==
- 2016: "Rusties" (with Nnedi Okorafor), published in Clarkesworld Magazine
- 2017: The Wooden Camel

== Awards and nominations ==
| Year | Award | Work | Category | Results |
|---|---|---|---|---|
| 2009 | African Movie Academy Awards | From a Whisper | Best Picture | Won |
| 2009 | African Movie Academy Awards | From a Whisper | Best Director | Won |
| 2009 | African Movie Academy Awards | From a Whisper | Best Screenplay | Won |
| 2009 | African Movie Academy Awards | From a Whisper | AMAA Achievement in Writing | Won |
| 2009 | African Movie Academy Awards | From a Whisper | Best Original Soundtrack | Won |
| 2009 | African Movie Academy Awards | From a Whisper | Best Actor in Leading Role | Nominated |
| 2009 | African Movie Academy Awards | From a Whisper | Best Actress in Leading Role | Nominated |
| 2009 | African Movie Academy Awards | From a Whisper | Best Child Actor | Nominated |
| 2009 | African Movie Academy Awards | From a Whisper | AMAA Achievement in Sound | Nominated |
| 2009 | African Movie Academy Awards | From a Whisper | AMAA Achievement in Art Direction | Nominated |
| 2009 | African Movie Academy Awards | From a Whisper | AMAA Achievement in Cinematography | Nominated |
| 2009 | African Movie Academy Awards | From a Whisper | AMAA Achievement in Makeup | Nominated |
| 2010 | Los Angeles Pan African Film Festival | From a Whisper | Best Feature | Won |
| 2010 | Cannes Independent Film Festival | Pumzi | Best Short Film | Won |
| 2010 | Venice Film Festival | Pumzi | Award of the City of Venice | Won |
| 2010 | Dubai International Film Festival | Pumzi | Muhr AsiaAfrica Award | Nominated |
| 2018 | AFI Fest | Rafiki | Audience Award | Nominated |
| 2018 | Bratislava International Film Festival | Rafiki | Viewers Choice Award | Won |
| 2018 | Cannes Film Festival | Rafiki | Queer Palm | Nominated |
| 2018 | Cannes Film Festival | Rafiki | Un Certain Regard Award | Nominated |
| 2018 | Carthage Film Festival | Rafiki | Best Music | Won |
| 2018 | Carthage Film Festival | Rafiki | Best Actress | Won |
| 2018 | Carthage Film Festival | Rafiki | Tanit d'Or | Nominated |
| 2018 | Chicago International Film Festival | Rafiki | Silver Q-Hugo | Won |
| 2018 | Chicago International Film Festival | Rafiki | Gold Q-Hugo | Nominated |
| 2018 | Durban International Film Festival | Rafiki | Best Film | Nominated |
| 2018 | Madrid International LGBT Film Festival | Rafiki | Jury Prize: Best Acting | Won |
| 2018 | Madrid International LGBT Film Festival | Rafiki | Audience Award: Best Feature Film | Won |
| 2018 | Merlinka Festival | Rafiki | Jury Prize: Best Feature Film | Nominated |
| 2018 | NewFest: New York's LGBT Film Festival | Rafiki | Audience Award: Narrative Feature | Won |
| 2018 | Oslo Films from the South Festival | Rafiki | Audience Award | Nominated |
| 2018 | Oslo Films from the South Festival | Rafiki | New Voices Award | Nominated |
| 2018 | São Paulo International Film Festival | Rafiki | Best Film | Nominated |
| 2018 | Seattle Queer Film Festival | Rafiki | Audience Award: Favorite Narrative Feature | Won |
| 2018 | Seattle Queer Film Festival | Rafiki | Jury Award: Best Feature Film | Won |
| 2018 | Sydney Film Festival | Rafiki | Audience Award: Best Narrative Feature | Nominated |
| 2018 | Valladolid International Film Festival | Rafiki | Best Feature Film | Nominated |
| 2019 | Black Reel Awards | Rafiki | Black Reel | Nominated |
| 2019 | Dublin International Film Festival | Rafiki | Young Programmers Choice Award | Won |
| 2019 | Göteborg Film Festival | Rafiki | Dragon Award | Nominated |
| 2019 | Kingston Reelout Film Festival | Rafiki | Outstanding Lead Performance | Won |
| 2019 | Kingston Reelout Film Festival | Rafiki | Outstanding Supporting Performance | Nominated |
| 2019 | Lucas - International Festival of Films for Children and Young People | Rafiki | Youngsters Award | Won |
| 2019 | Lucas - International Festival of Films for Children and Young People | Rafiki | Bridging the Borders Award | Won |
| 2019 | Milan International Lesbian and Gay Film Festival | Rafiki | Grand Jury Award: Best Film | Won |
| 2019 | Milan International Lesbian and Gay Film Festival | Rafiki | Special Jury Award: Best Feature Film | Won |
| 2019 | Minneapolis St. Paul International Film Festival | Rafiki | Audience Choice Award | Won |
| 2020 | Chlotrudis Awards | Rafiki | Best Adapted Screenplay | Nominated |
| 2020 | GLAAD Media Awards | Rafiki | Outstanding Film - Limited Release | Won |

== See also ==
- Africanfuturism
- Afrofuturism
- List of Afrofuturist films
- Afro-pessimism
- List of female film and television directors
- List of LGBT-related films directed by women
