= Philbert Aimé Mbabazi =

Rwandan filmmaker (born 1990)

- Born: Philbert Aimé Mbabazi Sharangabo; 1990 (age 35–36); Kigali, Rwanda
- Education: Geneva University of Art and Design
- Occupations: Director, producer, writer, editor
- Years active: 2012–present

Philbert Aimé Mbabazi Sharangabo (born 1990), is a Rwandan filmmaker. He has made several critically acclaimed short films including, The Liberators, Versus and I Got My Things And Left.

== Personal life ==
Philbert Aimé Mbabazi was born in 1990 in Kigali, Rwanda.

== Career ==
Mbabazi obtained his B.A in cinema department from Geneva University of Art and Design (HEAD – Genève, Haute école d'art et de design) in Geneva. During school times, he made two films The Liberators and Versus. Both films were screened in several film festivals including Vision du Réel Nyon, Internationale Kurzfilmtage Winterthur, Tampere, Oberhausen and Uppsala Short Film Festival. After graduating in 2017, he returned to Rwanda.

In 2019, he directed the short film I Got My Things And Left which won the Grand Prize at the Oberhausen International Short Film Festival. The film has screened at more than 20 film festivals such Rotterdam International Film Festival, Internationale Kurzfilmtage Winterthur, Go Short Nijmegen, Indie Lisboa and ISFF Hamburg, FIFF Namur etc.

He started the film production company called 'Imitana Productions' based in Kigali, Rwanda. He later made his maiden feature film Republika (Spectrum).

== Filmography ==
Year	Film	Role	Genre	Ref.
2012	Ruhago	Director	Short film	
2012	Ruhago Destiny FM	Director	Short film	
2014	City Dropout	Director	Short film	
2014	Akaliza Keza	Director	Short film	
2014	Mageragere City Dropout	Director	Short film	
2016	Waiting	Director	Short film	
2016	The Liberators	Director, writer, editor, producer, sound mix	Short film	
2016	Versus	Director, writer, editor, casting, producer, sound mix	Short film	
2018	Keza Lyn	Director, writer, producer	Short film	
2018	I Got My Things And Left	Director, editor, casting	Short film	
2020	Fish Bowl	Producer	Short film	
