= Malcolm's Echo: The Legacy of Malcolm X =

2008 documentary by Dami Akinnusi

Malcolm's Echo: The Legacy of Malcolm X is a 2008 American documentary by Dami Akinnusi about the legacy of Malcolm X.
