= Portrait of a Lone Farmer =

2013 Nigerian Danish documentary directed by Jide Tom Akinleminu

- Directed by: Jide Akinleminu
- Written by: Jide Akinleminu
- Starring: Akin Akinleminu; Grete Akinleminu; Jide Tom Akinleminu
- Distributed by: CPH:DOX
- Release date: 2013
- Running time: 75 minutes
- Country: Nigeria
- Languages: English; Yoruba

Portrait of a Lone Farmer is a 2013 Nigerian Danish documentary film by Jide Tom Akinleminu, about life on his father's chicken farm in Nigeria.
