= Cinema of Uganda =

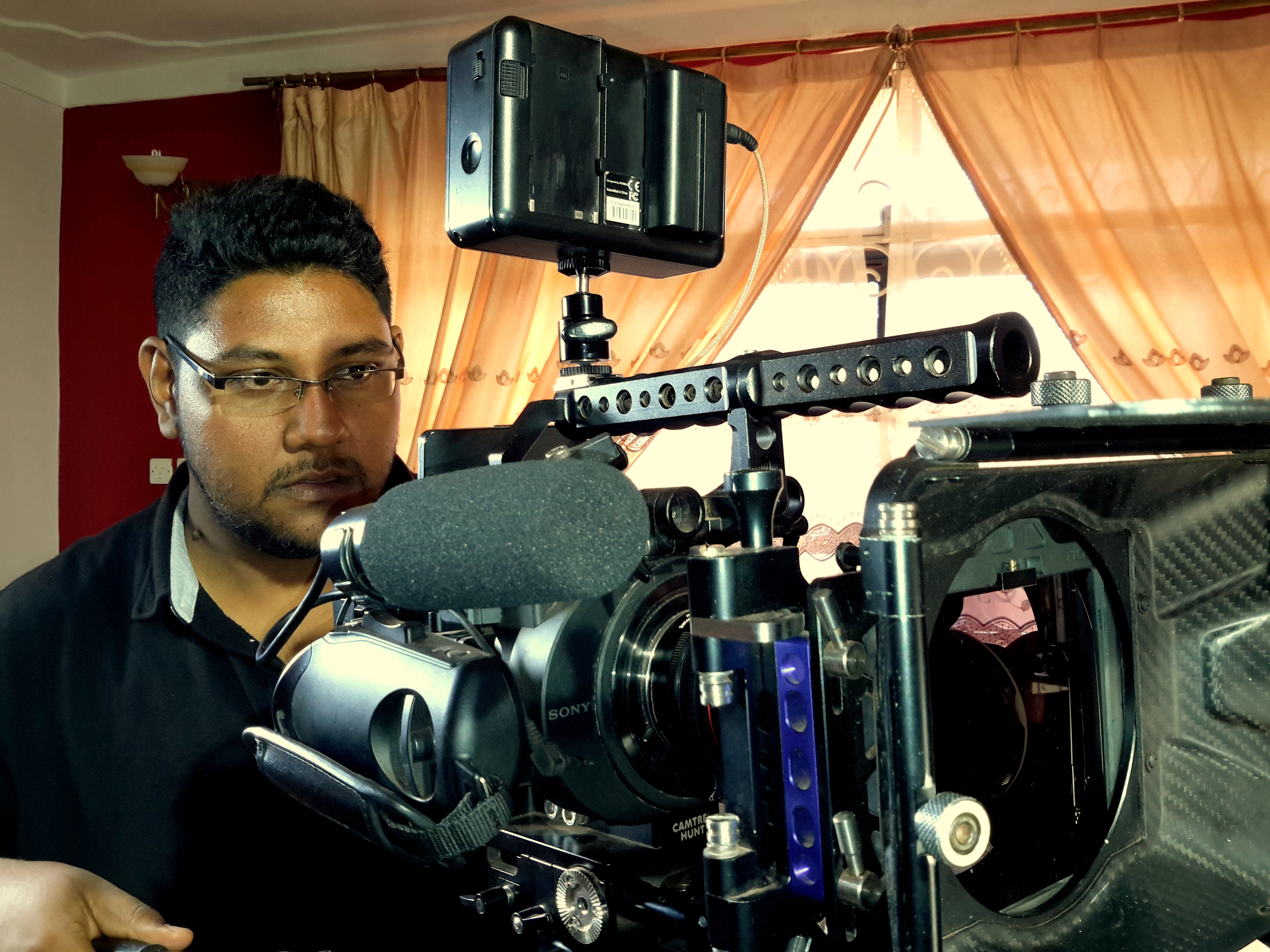
Filmmaker Jayant Maru, 2015.

The flag of Uganda

The emerging film industry in Uganda is known as Ugawood or sometimes Kinauganda by the locals. The 2005 production Feelings Struggle directed by Ashraf Ssemwogerere is credited with being the first Ugawood film. Many have asserted that this steadily growing film industry is derived from Hollywood, in the same manner as Nollywood and Bollywood. In a story that ran in a local newspaper in Uganda about the naming of the industry, filmmakers Kuddzu Isaac, Matt Bish and Usama Mukwaya were quoted as saying that Ugawood would be the most appropriate name for the industry.

For many English-language and foreign films, video jockeys (VJs) commonly overdub the dialogue with a translation into Ugandan languages, primarily Luganda. They often add their own jokes and commentary to localize the film, and are used for both theatrical releases and home video. Patrons also rent DVDs and watch feature films on prime-time TV.

Some films are funded by NGOs through cultural grants. Other films are produced with DIY equipment and low production budgets. Despite low production budgets, Uganda's film industry is quite productive. Isaac Nabwana's Ramon Film Productions, based in Wakaliga near Kampala, has produced more than 40 low-budget action films. The studio is best known for its 2010 film Who Killed Captain Alex?, which cost $85 to produce.

The Industry also has a strong and acclaimed film player since 2013. Jayant Maru of MAHJ Productions who has given Uganda gems at the BOX Office like The Route, K3NT & KAT3, and Sipi, which have not only been nominated in several international festivals but have also brought back home a number of accolades, not forgetting having his films available on Amazon Prime plus in-flight entertainment platforms.

The Uganda Communications Commission organizes the Uganda Film Festival to promote the film industry. In 2013, the film State Research Bureau swept four awards. In 2014, The Felistas Fable won four awards, including Best Director for Dilman Dila. The Pearl International Film Festival is held annually in Kampala.

== See also ==
- List of Ugandan films

Filmmakers

- Jayant Maru
- Matt Bish
- Mariam Ndagire
- Isaac Nabwana

Studios

- Wakaliwood
