= List of Ugandan musicians =

This is a list of Ugandan musicians and musical groups.

== A ==
- A Pass
- Allan Toniks
- Angela Kalule
- Angella Katatumba
- Aziz Azion
- Azawi

== B ==
- B2C
- Babaluku
- Bataka Squad
- Bebe Cool
- Benon Mugumbya
- Beenie Gunter
- Bobi Wine
- Bosmic Otim
- Bruno K

== C ==
- Chance Nalubega
- Chosen Becky
- Chris Evans
- Cindy Sanyu

== D ==
- David Lutalo
- Desire Luzinda
- DJ Shiru

== E ==
- Eddy Kenzo
- Eddy Yawe
- Elly Wamala
- Exodus (musician)

== F ==
- Fik Fameica
- Fille Mutoni
- Frank Mbalire
- Fred Masagazi
- Fresh Kid UG

== G ==
- Gabie Ntaate
- Gabriel K
- Geoffrey Lutaaya
- Geoffrey Oryema
- Giovanni Kiyingi
- Goodlyfe Crew
- Grace Nakimera
- Gravity Omutujju

== H ==
- Halima Namakula
- Henry Tigan
- Herman Basudde

== I ==
- Irene Ntale
- Iryn Namubiru
- Isaiah Katumwa

== J ==
- Jackie Akello
- Jackie Chandiru
- Janzi Band
- Jemimah Sanyu
- Jimmy Katumba
- Joanita Kawalya
- John Blaq
- Jose Chameleone
- Judith Babirye
- Juliana Kanyomozi
- Julie Mutesasira

== K ==
- Kataleya & Kandle
- Kalifah AgaNaga
- King Saha
- Klear Kut

== L ==
- Lanie Banks
- Leila Kayondo
- Levixone
- Lillian Mbabazi
- Lumix Da Don
- Lydia Jazmine

== M ==
- Mad Ice
- Madoxx Ssemanda Sematimba
- Mariam Ndagire
- Maro
- Mary Bata
- Master Blaster
- Master Parrot
- Mathias Walukagga
- Maureen Nantume
- Maurice Kirya
- Michael Ross Kakooza
- Milégé
- Moses Matovu
- Mowzey Radio

== N ==
- Naava Grey
- Naira Ali
- Navio
- Nick Nola
- Nince Henry

== O ==
- Omega 256

== P ==
- Pallaso
- Papa Cidy
- Paulo Kafeero
- Peter Miles
- Philly Lutaaya
- Phina Mugerwa
- Pia Pounds
- Producer Hannz

== R ==
- Rachael Magoola
- Rachel K
- Radio and Weasle
- Ragga Dee
- Ray G
- Rema Namakula
- Ruyonga

== S ==
- Saba Saba
- Sam Gombya
- Samalie Matovu
- Sheebah Karungi
- Sister Charity
- Sophie Gombya
- Sophie Nantongo
- Spice Diana
- Ssewa Ssewa
- St. Nelly-Sade
- Stecia Mayanja
- Suzan Kerunen
- Sylver Kyagulanyi

== U ==
- Undercover Brothers Ug

== V ==
- Vampino
- Viboyo
- Vinka

== W ==
- Wilson Bugembe
- Winnie Nwagi

== Z ==
- GNL Zamba
