= List of Ugandan singers =

This is a list of notable Ugandan singers that have entered the industry, currently working or have left the industry.

== A ==
- Allan Toniks
- A Pass
- Angella Katatumba
- Angela Kalule
- Aziz Azion
- Azawi
- Alien Skin
- Acidic Vokoz
- Ava Peace
- Aganaga

== B ==
- Babaluku
- Bebe Cool
- Benon Mugumbya
- Bobi Wine
- Bosmic Otim
- Biswanka
- Big Trill
- Betty namukasa
- Baby Deo

== C ==
- Chris Evans
- Cinderella Sanyu
- Chosen Becky
- Chance Nalubega
- Coco finger
- Chozen Blood
- Crystal Panda
- Carol Nantongo
- Catherine Kusasira

== D ==
- David Lutalo
- Desire Luzinda
- Daddy Andre

== E ==
- Eddy Kenzo
- Elly Wamala
- Eddy Yawe

== F ==
- Fik Fameica
- Fille Mutoni
- Frank Mbalire
- Fred Masagazi
- Fresh Kid UG
- Fyno UG
- Feffe Busi

== G ==
- Gabriel K
- Giovanni Kiyingi
- Geoffrey Oryema
- Gravity Omutujju
- Grace Nakimera
- Gloria Bugyie
- Geofrey Lutaya
- Gerald kiwewa

== H ==
- Halima Namakula
- Henry Tigan
- Haruna Mubiru
- Hellen Lukoma

== I ==
- Irene Ntale
- Iryn Namubiru
- Isaiah Katumwa

== J ==
- Jackie Akello
- Jackie Chandiru
- Jemimah Sanyu
- Jimmy Katumba
- Joanita Kawalya
- Jose Chameleone
- John Blaq
- Judith Babirye
- Julie Mutesasira
- Juliana Kanyomozi
- Jackie Kaziire
- Juliana Kanyomozi
- Joshua Baraka

== K ==
- King Saha
- Kapeke
- Kataleya and Kandle
- Kent and Flosso
- Karole Kasiita

== L ==
- Lanie Banks
- Levixone
- Leila Kayondo
- Lilian Mbabazi
- Lydia Jazmine
- Lumix Da Don
- Lili Pazo
- Liam Voice

== M ==
- Mad Ice
- Mariam Ndagire
- Madoxx Ssemanda Sematimba
- Maro
- Maurice Kirya
- Master Blaster
- Michael Ross Kakooza
- Moses Matovu
- Mowzey Radio
- Mudra D'viral
- Martha Mukisa
- Mary Bata
- Master Parrot

== N ==
- Navio
- Nick Nola
- Nince Henry
- Nandor Love
- Nina Roz

== P ==
- Paulo Kafeero
- Papa Cidy
- Pallaso
- Philly Lutaaya
- Peter Miles
- Phina Mugerwa
- Paul T
- Princess Amirah
- Prince Exit

== R ==
- Rachel K
- Ray G
- Rema Namakula
- Rachael Magoola
- Ragga Dee
- Ruyonga
- Racheal Ray
- Rab J Ekyafaayo

== S ==
- Sam Gombya
- Saba Saba aka Krazy Native
- Ssewa Ssewa
- Sheebah Karungi
- Sophie Gombya
- Sister Charity
- Spice Diana
- St. Nelly-Sade
- Stecia Mayanja
- Suzan Kerunen
- Sylver Kyagulanyi
- Ssebale Fred
- Ssegawa Vicent
- Shine Omukiga
- Sandra Nax
- Ssebata Fred

== V ==
- Vampino
- Viboyo
- Vinka
- Victor Ruz

== W ==
- Wilson Bugembe
- Winnie Nwagi
- Weasel Manizo

== Z ==
- GNL Zamba
- Ziza Bafana
