= Chance Nalubega =

Ugandan singer and musician

- Born: Chance Nalubega; Masaka, Uganda
- Origin: Kampala, Uganda
- Genres: Kadongo Kamu, Afrobeat, Ugandan pop
- Occupations: Singer; Songwriter
- Instrument: Vocals
- Years active: 1996–present
- Publishers: Kasiwukira Studios; Lusyn Enterprises; Dr. Tee's Studio
- Formerly of: Gomiba Band

Chance Nalubega is a Ugandan musician, singer and songwriter. She is the founder and leader of the Gomiba Band. Her music style is often categorized within Kadongo Kamu but it also incorporates elements of soukous, pop, and Afrobeat.

== Background and education ==
Chance Nalubega was born in Masaka, Uganda. She is a member of the Ngabi clan.

She moved to Kampala with her mother in August 1991 and sought shelter at Christian Life Church in Bwaise after their belongings including; a gomesi, small pillow, plate, and tea kettle were stolen. With no money at the time, they were allowed to stay at the church for three months. The church administration clarified that it was not responsible for their security or the loss of their property.

In Kampala she did some jobs that included vending food, domestic chores such as washing and cooking in peoples' homes, and working as a hairdresser in Kibuye, where she earned 45,000 Ugandan shillings. She later returned to Masaka to support her siblings who had been abandoned by their father.

Nalubega's father was Muslim, while her mother was a born-again Christian affiliated with Masaka Gosma Church.

== Music career ==
Chance Nalubega used to sing in a church choir in Masaka. She later joined the choir at the Christian Life Church, she did not receive any payment for her participation.

=== Joining the Pride Band ===
While she was at a hair salon in Kibuye, Pride Band announced over the radio that it was recruiting singers. During the auditions, she performed some of her songs in front of a panel judges that included; Andrew Benon Kibuuka, Charles James Ssenkubuge and Aloysius Matovu Joy.

She joined the Pride band and performed with it for three years, from 1994 to 1997, earning a salary of 80,000 Ugandan shillings.

In 1997, she met Kato Lubwama who connected her to a studio in Bweyogerere where she recorded some of her first songs that were released and she earned money from selling the music tapes. She used some of the money to start up the Gomiba Band. Gomiba Band was composed of Jeniffer, also known as Full Figure, Justini Namuddu, Swabra Lubega and Dan Bazaawe. The band released albums that included; Mukyakale. The Gomiba band let broke up.

=== Releasing of her music albums ===
In 1999, Chance Nalubega released her debut album titled "Guma Omwoyo" under Kasiwukira Studios which was owned by Eriya Bugembe Ssebunya. Eriya Bugembe Ssebunya paid Chance Nalubega 1,500,000 Ugandan shillings for the album. It sold over 250 copies/tapes.

In 2000, Nalubega released Balinsekerela album at Kasiwukira Studios and was paid 3,000,000 Ugandan shillings for it.

In 2001, Nalubega released Yiga Okwagala album and she was paid 15,000,000 Ugandan shillings for it.

In 2002, Nalubega released "I really love you" album.

In 2003, Nalubega released Ennugu album.

In 2005, Nalubega released Kulikayo Mwami album.

In 2006, Nalubega released Agaliffa album.

=== Later career and resurgence ===
After the breakup of Nalubega's Gomiba band, she took a musical break to focus on raising her three children (one son and two daughters) and managing her personal business ventures.

In 2006, she performed alongside Lady Aisha, Paul Kafeero, Winnie Munyenga, Fred Nkambwe and Impala Jazz Band at the La Royale Banqueting Suites in North London.

In 2018, she performed at the Bayimba International Festival of the Arts.

In October 2023, she was the headline performer at the "Legends of the Nile" concert in Kampala, where she performed alongside Ragga Dee and Sam and Sophie Gombya.

== Artistry and musical style ==
Chance Nalubega's music style is primarily categorized as Kadongo Kamu but it also incorporates elements of soukous, pop, and Afrobeat. In her songs, she addresses societal norms, relationship complexities, financial struggles and everyday challenges.

== Discography ==
=== Her music albums include; ===
Chance Nalubega has albums that include;

- Guma Omwoyo (1999).
- Balinsekerela (2000).
- Yiga Okwagala (2001).
- Ennugu (2003).
- Mwami Kulikayo (2005).
- Agaliffa (2006).
- Tonkyawa (2006).
- Abalungi Balumya.
- Dear Wange.
- I really love you (2002).

=== A list of some of her most well-known songs includes ===
- Abatesi (1999).
- Guma Omwoyo.
- Obulamu Bwa Sente
- Abakyakala Mukyakale.
- Nyirira.
- Mwedigidile.
- Gwendikwato.
- Abakyala.
- Ennaku y'amasanyalaze.
- Ab'ennugu.
- Abalungi.
- Kandagge.
- Musajja Ddala.
- Yiga Okwagala.
- Omusheshe.
- Abalungi Balumya.
- Ekyaalo
- Omukwano
- Nakukyawa
- Mwami Kulikayo.
- Signal
- Balinsekerela.
- Byansobera.
- Dear Wange.
- Omukwano guluma.
- Abatesi Remix (featuring Radio and Weasel)^{.}
- Mwenywere.

== See also ==
- Kadongo Kamu
- List of Ugandan musicians
- Paul Kafeero
- Music of Uganda
