= Jemimah Sanyu =

Ugandan musician (born 1986)

- Born: 25 March 1986 (age 40); Budondo, Jinja District, Uganda
- Occupations: Musician, singer
- Years active: 2007–present
- Spouse: Legend P
- Children: Katumba Ivy Nagawa
- Website: www.jemimahsanyu.com Musical career
- Genres: World; pop; R&B; jazz; afrobeat
- Label: Lab 446

Jemimah Sanyu, also known as the Stage Gladiator, is a Ugandan musician, performer, producer, and voice coach. Sanyu met President Yoweri Museveni while singing at the I am a Ugandan album premier. She has shared a stage with African performers including but not limited to: Habib Koite, Navio, Joanita Kawalya of Afrigo Band, and Juliana Kanyomozi.

Sanyu peaked at #4 on the HipHop charts with her hit single Ziba Amaaso in the fifth week of 2012. Her other charting hits included I am a Ugandan peaking at #8 and Kankusute at #17, both on the HiPipo charts in 2011. All of her charting songs gained good radio air play.

== Music ==
Sanyu, a two-time Diva Awards nominee, started doing music professionally in 2007, when she joined Grayce Records. Sanyu experienced a meteoric rise as a music star of Afro pop melodies and dance music mostly because of her strong and wild live performances and her voice. She hosts a music night dubbed Sanyu Talks at Jazzville Bugolobi every Thursday accompanied by her band UNIT 446.

Sanyu was one of the divas chosen to perform at the Serena Hotel the Qwela Junction, dubbed the "Divas' Junction", alongside veteran singer and one of Afrigo Band's lead vocalists Rachael Magoola, Solome, Rita Sabiiti, Naava Grey, Maureen Rutabingwa, and Sandra Suubi. She mesmerized the audience by dancing atop tables, a stunt known as a Bebe after Bebe Cool did it at a Miss Uganda beauty pageant event.

Jemimah Sanyu was a member of Janzi Band from 2010 to 2012 as their lead vocalist after leaving Zawee Band as a backup singer.

== Discography ==
Sanyu has performed live all across Africa, including festivals and corporate events. She has also recorded an eight track studio album Amaaso go googera, which immediately ensured her status as a star on East Africa's music scene.

=== Albums ===
- Amaaso go googera

=== Songs ===
The songs include;

- Ziba amaaso
- Sitya
- I am a Ugandan
- This Love
- Yakubedha
- Amaaso go googera

=== Live performances ===
Sanyu has performed on many stages to entertain people. She has performed all across Africa, including but not limited to Uganda, Rwanda, Ethiopia, Kenya, and Tanzania.

Sanyu was selected to perform on World Music Day 2015 in Uganda alongside Undercover Brothers Ug, Sandy Soul, and Ruyonga.

Sanyu has performed at:

- DoaDoa
- Selam Festival Ethiopia
- Bayimba Festival Uganda 2014
- World Music Day Uganda 2015
- Sondeka (Kenya)
- Visa for Music

== Personal life ==
Jemimah has been dating her producer Legend P and the two welcomed a baby girl in March 2017. Jemimah had been performing at her weekly shows at Sheraton Hotel and Serena Kyigo and other stages while heavily pregnant until she got into labour.

== Nominations and awards ==
Awards
Year	Award	Category	Result	Citation
2011	Diva Music Awards Uganda	Rising Diva	Nominated	
2010	Diva Music Awards Uganda	Afro-beat Diva "I am a Ugandan"	Nominated	

== See also ==
- List of Ugandan musicians
- Isaiah Katumwa
- Giovanni Kiyingi
- Suzan Kerunen
