= DJ Shiru =

Ugandan musician

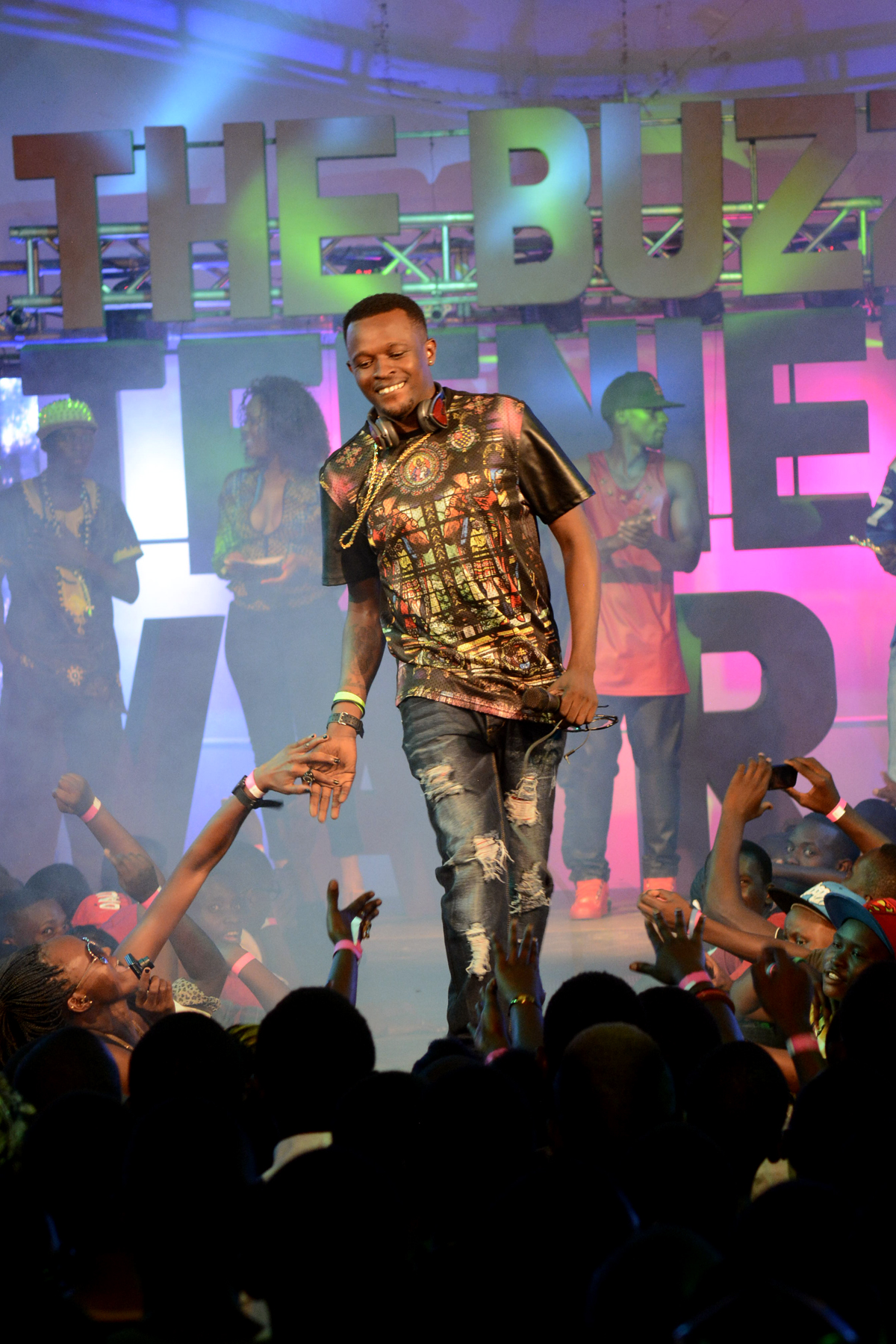
- DJ Shiru
- Other name: Shirumatic Pro
- Citizenship: Ugandan
- Occupation: DJ
- Known for: Entertaining people as a DJ

Kiberu Bashir (born 27 July 1986) from Nyendo, Masaka, professionally known by his stage name "DJ SHIRU". He is a Ugandan disc jockey and record producer. However, DJ SHIRU started his career at the young age while following his brother, the famous DJ Rota in Kampala, Uganda. He is the show host of the DanceFloor at one of Uganda's top stations 97.7 Record FM.

DJ Shiru hosts a number of annual events including: The Mega-Shirumatic Experience and East African Deejayz Carnival.

== See also ==
- Jose Chameleone

== Awards ==
- Best DJ of the Year 2013 "Hipipo Awards"
- Best DJ of the Year 2014 "Hipipo Awards"
- Best DJ of the Year 2015/16 "Hipipo Awards"
- Won Lifetime Achievement Award celebrating 10 years of winning 2016 "Buzz Teen Awards"
