= Rema Namakula =

Ugandan singer

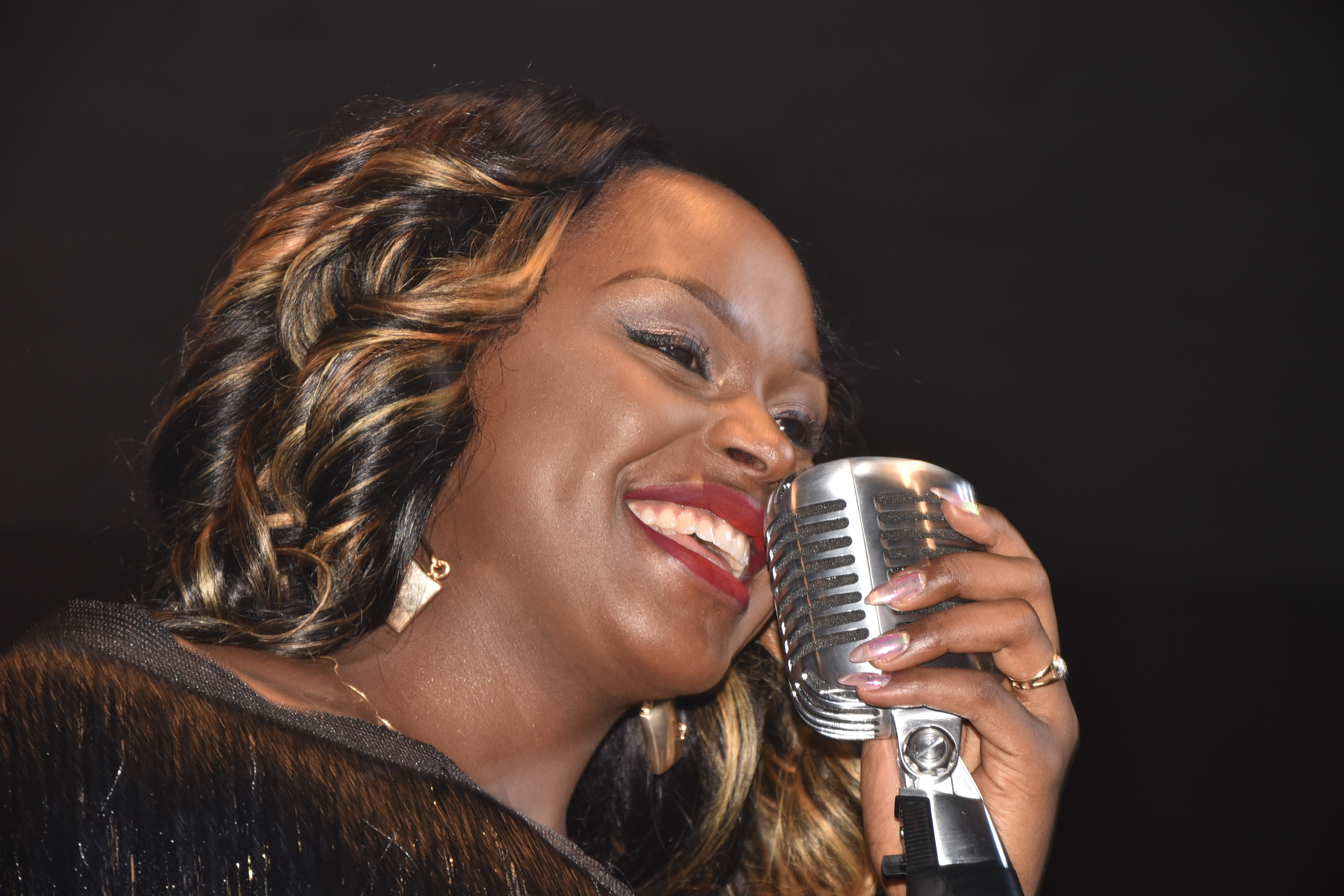

Background information
- Born: 24 April 1991 (age 35); Kampala, Uganda
- Occupations: Singer, songwriter producer
- Years active: 2010–present
- Education: Kyambogo University
- Spouse: Hamza Ssebunya (m. 2019)

Rehema Namakula (born 24 April 1991), known professionally as Rema Namakula or simply Rema, is a Ugandan singer, songwriter, and music producer.

== Early life and education ==
Rema was born in Lubaga Hospital, on 24 April 1991, to the late Hamida Nabbosa and the late Mukiibi Ssemakula. She is the last-born in her family. She attended Kitante Primary School for her elementary school education. She studied at Saint Balikudembe Senior Secondary School for both O-Level and A-Level studies. Later, she joined Kyambogo University, where she completed.

== Career ==
During her Senior 6 vacation, she began singing karaoke. Later, she became a back-up singer to another Ugandan female musician Halima Namakula, who became her mentor. She continued her music career as a backup artist for Ugandan musician Bebe Cool in gagamel, Bebe Cool's recording group. In 2013, Bebe Cool was watching television when he saw Rema talking about launching a solo album, which Bebe Cool didn't know about. So he fired her and she went solo. In 2013 she released "Oli Wange" which was written by Nince Henry which made her popular in the music industry of Uganda.

In 2016, Rema Namakula was selected to represent Uganda at the fourth season of Coke Studio Africa 2016. Other Ugandan recording artists selected included Lydia Jazmine, Eddy Kenzo and Radio and Weasel. Other participants in the invitation-only event included 2Baba (2Face Idibia) from Nigeria and Trey Songz from the United States.

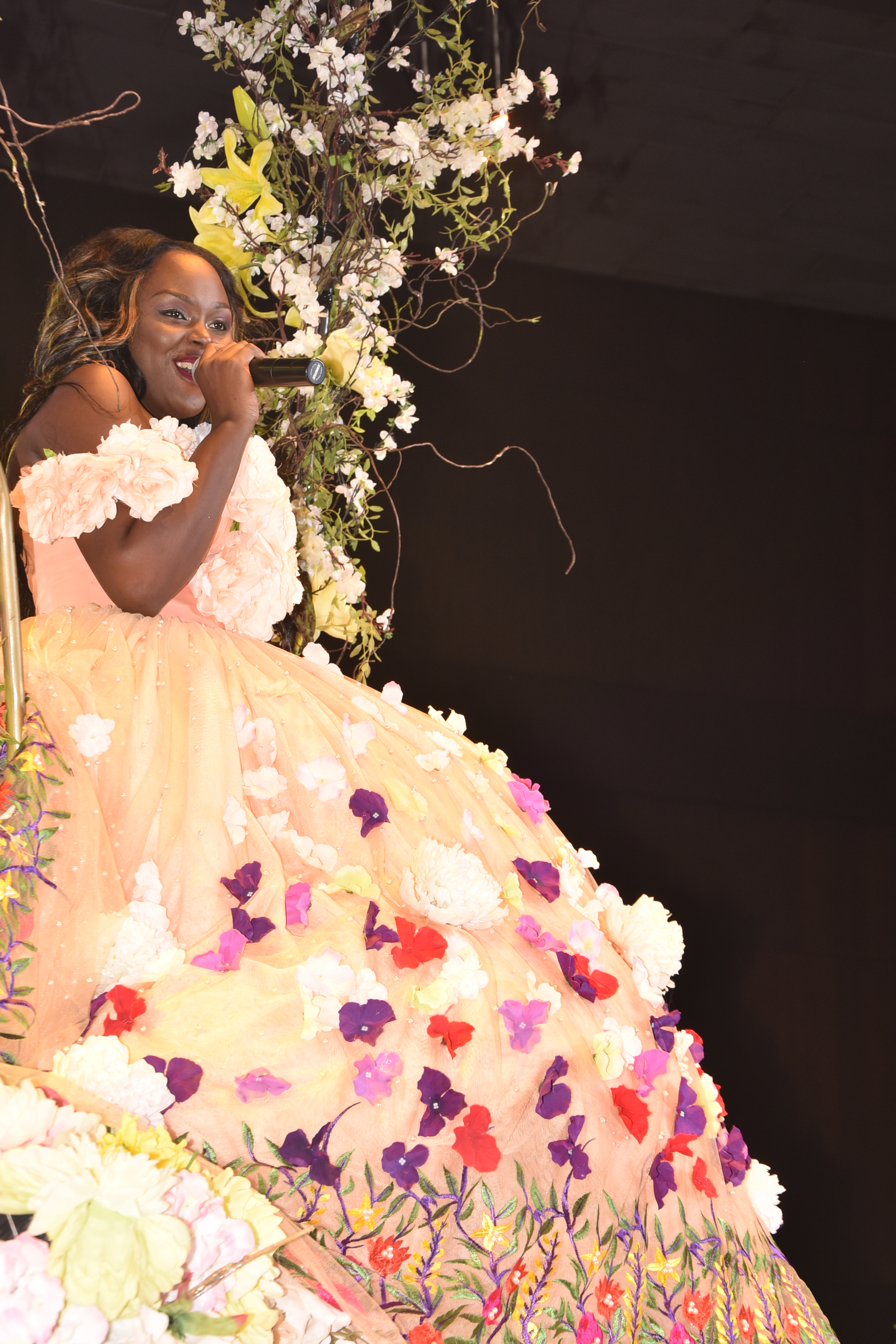

== Personal life ==
Over time, Namakula began a romantic relationship with Ugandan recording artist Eddy Kenzo. On 26 December 2014, Namakula gave birth to a daughter at Paragon Hospital, in the Kampala neighborhood of Bugoloobi. Kenzo (real name Edrisa Musuuza), who has another daughter (Maya Musuuza) from a previous relationship, acknowledged being the father and named the newborn Aamaal Musuuza.

On 14 November 2019, Namakula introduced her new fiancé, Dr. Hamza Ssebunya, in a ceremony that took place at her home in Nabbingo, near Kampala. The introduction was a national affair, as thousands camped out along the procession route to her home.

On 7 November 2021, Namakula welcomed her second child. A baby girl named Aaliyah Ssebunya.

== Partial discography ==
- "Oli Wange"
- "Katonotono"
- "Lean On Me"
- "Lowooza Kunze"
- "Deep in Love"
- "Muchuuzi"
- "Atuuse"
- "Kukaliba"
- "Fire Tonight"
- "Ceaze and Sekkle"
- "Banyabo"
- "Loco" (featuring DJ Harold and Chike)
- "Akaffe Che"
- "Tonyt"
- "Love Commissioner"

== Music awards ==
HiPipo Music Awards 2013: Won

- Best HiPipo Charts Artist
- Best Breakthrough Artist
- Best Female Artist
- Best R&B Song, "Oli Wange"

HiPipo Music Awards 2014: Won

- Best female Artist of the Year
- Best female Artist (Dancehall)
- Best female RnB song – Kukaliba

== See also ==
- Juliana Kanyomozi
- Bobi Wine
- Iryn Namubiru
- Stecia Mayanja
- Irene Ntale
- Jose Chameleone
- Bebe Cool
- Halima Namakula
