= Mugerwa =

Mugerwa is a surname. Notable people with the surname include:

- Peter James Nkambo Mugerwa (1933–2020), Ugandan lawyer
- Phina Mugerwa, Ugandan singer
- Roy Mugerwa (1942–2019), Ugandan physician
- Wilberforce Kisamba Mugerwa (1945–2021), Ugandan economist
- Yasser Mugerwa, Ugandan footballer
