= Khalifah Aganaga =

Ugandan dancehall & Afrobeat artist and politician

- Born: Sadat Mukiibi; 3 March 1990 (age 36); Kabowa, Kampala, Uganda
- Origin: Uganda
- Occupations: Musician, songwriter, producer, and politician
- Instrument: Vocals
- Years active: 2012–present
- Label: Bad Character Studios

Khalifah Aganaga (born Sadat Mukiibi on 3 March 1990) is a Ugandan dancehall and Afrobeat artist, songwriter, producer, and politician. He rose to prominence after the release of songs such as Mina Konda, Ndabirawa, Oyitangayo, Kiboko ft Jose Chameleone and for his involvement in Uganda's entertainment. He is a winner of the several awards such as Zzina Awards, the Buzz Teeniez awards. He has also operates under his record label Bad Character Studios and has written music for several Ugandan artists.

He was the candidate for Kawempe North MP By-Election under the Forum for Democratic Change (FDC) in 2025.

== Early life and education ==
Khalifah was born and raised in Kabowa, a suburb of Kampala, Uganda, where he was brought up by a single mother. He went to St Aloysius primary school for his primary education before joining Kawanda Secondary School for both O-Level and A-Level education.

== Career ==
=== Musical ===
Aganaga began his music journey in 2012 when he reportedly used tuition money to record his first single, Mina Konda. The song gained traction on radio and television, helping him break into Uganda's music industry. He later worked with Twinkle Star Agency under manager Emma Carlos, which supported his early rise.

=== Political ===
In 2021, Aganaga entered Ugandan politics by contesting for the Rubaga South parliamentary seat, though he was unsuccessful. In 2025, he was nominated as the Forum for Democratic Change (FDC) flag bearer for the Kawempe North by-election.

== Discography ==
=== Singles ===
- Mina Konda
- Ndabirawa
- Oyitangayo
- Jangu
- Business
- Katono
- Woman
- Nassanga (The Best I Know)
- Mukidongo
- Sigwe Asose
- Zilye
- Kyusaamu
- Nkulowozako
- KAWAIDA
- Expensive
- Ananipa (Emotions)
- Halo
- Toyinza
- Fumita Emboozi
- Sibafanana
- Cinema

=== Collaborations ===
- Gudi Gude - Radio & Weasel ft. Khalifah Aganaga
- Ssaagala - Spice Diana ft. Khalifah Aganaga
- Katono Remix - Khalifah Aganaga
- Nkusaba One Day - ft. Khalifah Aganaga
- Bambo - Khalifah Aganaga

== Awards and nominations ==
Award	Year	Status	Awarder
Best Male Breakthrough Artist	2014	Won	HiPipo Music Awards
Teeniez Dancehall Artist	2014	Won	Buzz Teeniez Awards
Teeniez Hottest Collabo	2015	Won	Buzz Teeniez Awards
Teeniez Hottest Riddim	2015	Won	Buzz Teeniez Awards
Inspirational Song of the Year	2016	Won	Zzina Awards (Galaxy FM)
Best Hip Hop Song	2017	Won	HiPipo Music Awards

== See also ==
- Music of Uganda
- Afrobeats
- List of Ugandan musicians
- Jose Chameleon
- Forum for Democratic Change
