= Mowzey Radio =

Ugandan musician (1983–2018)

- Born: Moses Nakintije Ssekibogo; 25 January 1985; Busoga, Uganda
- Died: 1 February 2018 (aged 33); Kampala, Uganda
- Resting place: Nakawuka Kagga, Wakiso, Uganda
- Education: Makerere University
- Occupation: Musician. Song Writer.Recording Producer (Angel Music).
- Years active: 2005–2018

Moses Nakintije Ssekibogo (25 January 1985 – 1 February 2018), also known as Mowzey Radio, sometimes referred to as Moses Radio, was a Ugandan musician. He was one of the main performers of the Ugandan music group Goodlyfe Crew together with Jose Chameleone's brother Weasel Manizo (real name Douglas Sseguya).

== Career ==
Born and raised in Jinja District of Busoga Sub region, Moses Radio attended Kibuye Primary school in Makindye and later, Holy Cross Lake View Jinja for his O-Levels and Kiira College Butiki for A-Levels. He earned a bachelor's degree in Community Sociology from Makerere University in 2005.

Radio released his first solo song, "Tujja Kuba Wamu", in 2004 while at Makerere University where he completed a degree in psychology, before joining the Leone Island Music Empire in 2005. He started as a backup singer along with Weasel behind Jose Chameleone. He had his first success in the year 2005 by releasing the reggae love song "Jennifer". The official stage video for the song was filmed by Ugandan music promoter DJ Erycom.

In 2006, Radio released "Sweet Lady", another well-received song that introduced him to a large fan base in Uganda.

In October 2007, Radio, Weasel and Jose Chameleone toured the United States and the Caribbean. Before they returned home, Radio and Weasel had misunderstandings with Chameleone. They quit the group and formed Goodlyfe Crew, which became successful. Their first song was "Nakudata", followed by "Ngamba".

Radio collaborated with Rabadaba on the song "Ability" together with Weasel, produced by Just Jose. He also had collaborations with local and international artists, winning awards and several nominations, including the BET nominations.

Radio and Weasel had many hits, including "Ability", "Akapapula", "Bread and Butter", "Hellenah" ft David Lutalo, "Juice Juicy", "Lwaki Onnumya", "Magnetic", "Mr DJ", "Mukama Talya Mandazi", "Ngenda Maaso", "Nyambula", "Nyumbani", "Obudde", "Potential", "Sitaani", "Zuena", and "(Tukikole) Neera", which played incessantly on most radio and TV stations in Africa in 2014.

== BET Award nomination ==
Mowzey Radio and his musical partner Weasel were nominated in the category of "Best International Act Africa" at the BET Awards in 2013. This nomination was in recognition of their chart-topping single "Magnetic", which had gained significant popularity since its release in 2012. The duo was nominated alongside other notable African artists, including Ice Prince Zamani, Toya Delazy, Donald, and R2Bees. Although they did not win, the nomination marked a significant milestone in their music career, garnering them increased international recognition.

== Later life and death ==
Radio died on 1 February 2018 at Case Hospital in Kampala, Uganda, from a blood clot in his brain from injuries sustained in a bar brawl in Entebbe a few days earlier. He was laid to rest at Kagga-Nakawuka in Wakiso District.

== HiPipo Music Awards ==
Radio was a fifteen-time HiPipo Music Awards Winner. Below are the categories he won.

2018 – 6th HiPipo Music Awards winner

- Best Duo/Group Radio and Weasel
- Song of the Year (Uganda) Radio & Weasel & B2C – Gutamiiza
- Best Song Writer Moses Radio

2017 – 5th HiPipo Music Awards winner

- Song of the Year South Sudan
- Sambala by MB Law and Rhapsody Ft Radio & Weasel

2016 – 4th HiPipo Music Awards winner

- Best Music Group – Radio and Weasel
- Song of the Year – Juicy by Radio and Weasel
- Best Song Writer – Moses Radio

2015 – 3rd HiPipo Music Awards winner

- Best Duo/Group Artist – Radio And Weasel
- Album of the Year – Amaaso Ntunga By Radio And Weasel
- Song of the Year – Neera – Radio And Weasel
- Best Rnb Song Neera – Radio And Weasel
- The Best Duo-Group Artist: Radio and Weasel
- The Album of the Year: Obudde Album – Radio and Weasel

2014 – 2nd HiPipo Music Awards winner

- The Best Duo/Group Artist: Radio and Weasel
- The Album of the Year: Obudde Album – Radio and Weasel

== See also ==
- List of Ugandan musicians
