= Fresh Kid UG =

Ugandan rapper

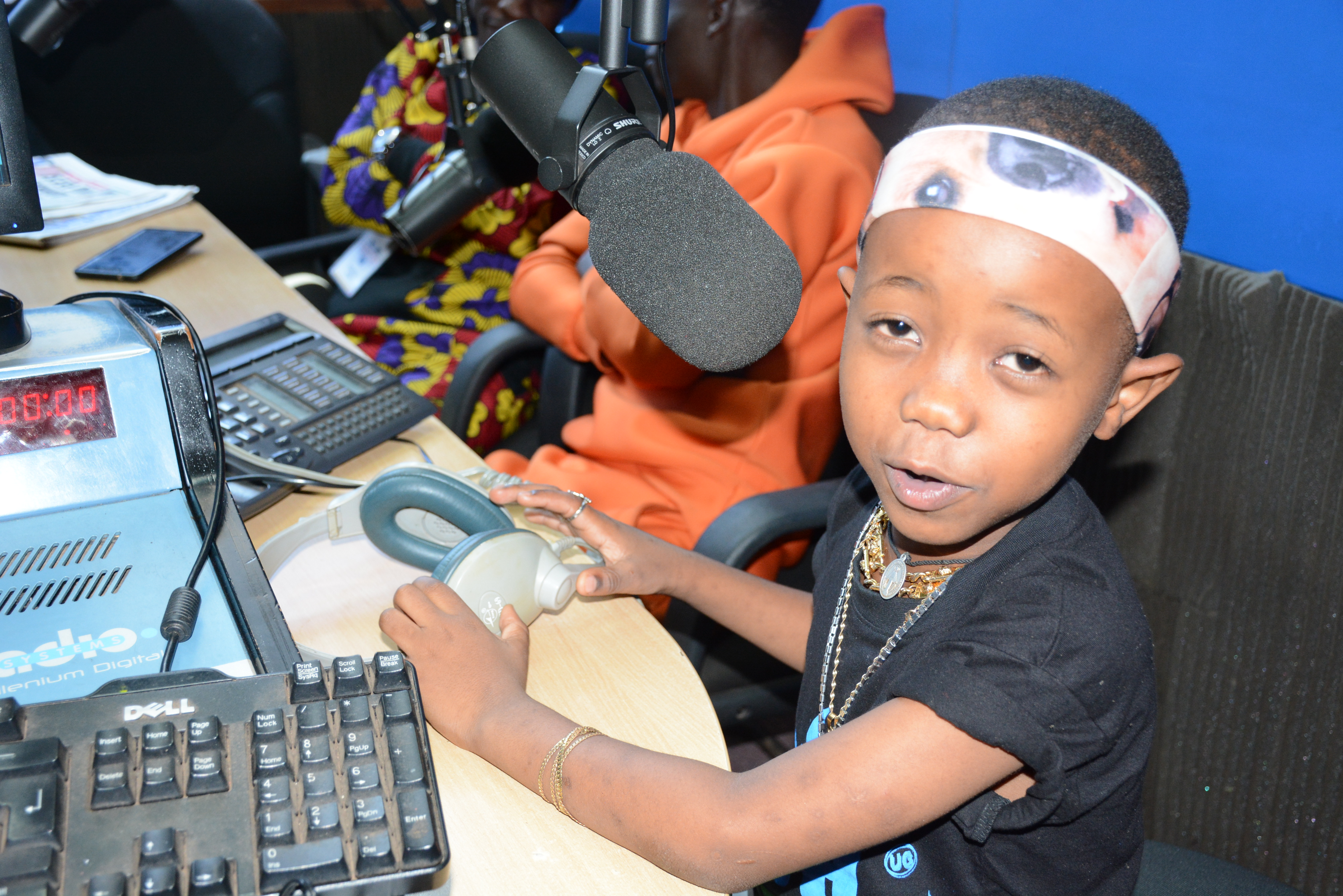
- Fresh Kid UG

Background information
- Born: Patrick Sennyonjo; April 20, 2012 (age 14); Luweero, Uganda
- Genres: Hip hop, rap, Dancehall
- Occupations: Rapper, Artist, Entertainer, Performer
- Instrument: Vocals
- Years active: 2018–present
- Labels: De Texas Entertainment & king Omar presents.

Patrick Sennyonjo (born July 1, 2012), popularly known as Fresh Kid UG, is a Ugandan artist, singer and rapper. In 2018, he was known for being the youngest famous musician in Uganda.

== Music career ==
His manager Francis claims to have found Fresh Kid in a rural area of Uganda miming some songs of Fik Fameica. He brought him to Kampala, and paid his school fees while he helped start the rapper's career. Fresh Kid eventually got a bursary from Rajiv Ruparelia to study at Kampala Parents School. In 2019, Francis signed Fresh Kid under De Texas Entertainment. Fresh Kid's parents fell out with Francis over alleged failure to respect contractual duties, and Fresh Kid left De Texas and signed with MC Events.

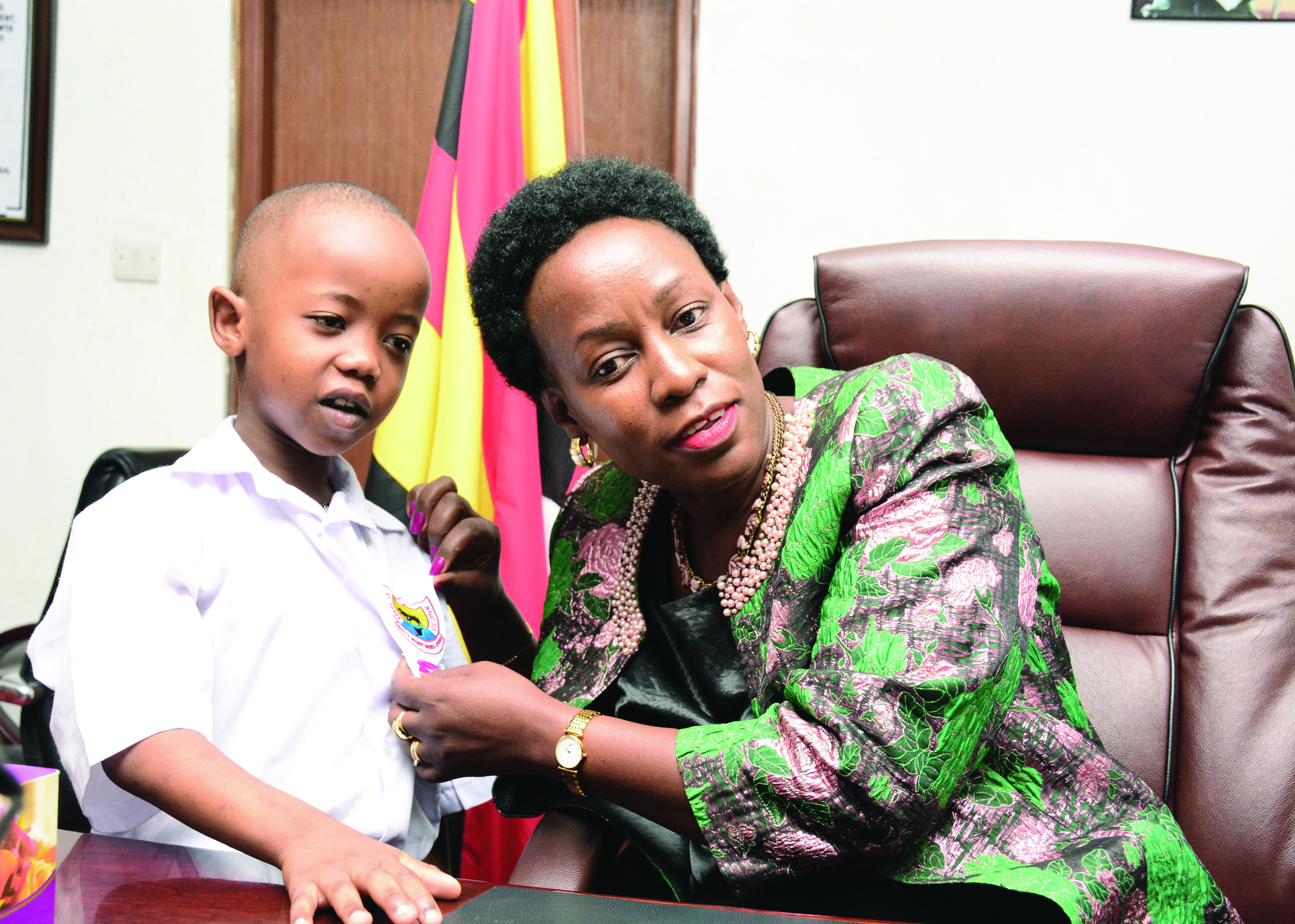
Fresh Kid Uganda

The same year, Ugandan Minister of State for Youth and Children Affairs Florence Nakiwala Kiyingi warned Fresh Kid from performing during school hours since according to the Ugandan Labour Law, "no-one under 18 should work". Uganda's constitution Article 59 clause 56 line 8 restricts young children below 18 from being used for at least any financial benefits. Nakiwala stated that Fresh Kid would be taken to juvenile prison if he disobeyed this law.

== Discography ==
- Banteeka (His first hit song)
- Bambi
- Fear None
- Kipepeo ( with Jose Chameleone )

== See also ==
- List of Ugandan musicians
- A Pass
