= Master Parrot =

Ugandan dancehall and Afro-pop musician (1978–2026)

- Born: David Sifaayo; 1978; Kampala, Uganda
- Died: 1 June 2026 (aged 47–48) Kampala, Uganda
- Genres: Dancehall, Afro-pop
- Occupations: Musician, songwriter
- Years active: 2000s–2026
- Label: Fire Base

David Sifaayo (1978 – 1 June 2026), professionally known by his stage name Master Parrot, was a veteran Ugandan dancehall, ragga, and Afro-pop musician. He rose to prominence in the early 2000s as one of the founding members of the Fire Base Crew alongside Bobi Wine. He cemented his household name status with the release of hit singles such as "Muliro" and "Ekikompola", which became defining sounds of contemporary Ugandan pop music during that era.

== Musical career ==
Master Parrot began his musical journey in Kampala in the early 2000s during what is widely considered the golden era of contemporary Ugandan dancehall. As a pioneer member of the Kamwokya-based Fire Base Crew, he collaborated closely with Bobi Wine and was featured on early collective projects, including the "Fire Base Crew Anthem". His distinct style was characterized by a signature gravelly vocal delivery, high-energy stage performances, and witty lyrics.

Beyond his foundational years with Fire Base, Master Parrot's fluid talent saw him temporarily associate with the rival Leone Island music camp led by Jose Chameleone, making him one of the few artists of the era to cross over and work within both major music powerhouses. He launched an independent solo career in 2009.

After stepping away from the mainstream spotlight to combat personal and alcohol-related challenges in the late 2000s, Master Parrot underwent a spiritual transition. He refocused his musical style towards faith-based themes, releasing gospel-infused ragga songs such as "Wakyuusa" and "Kulabirira" to inspire personal transformation and resilience.

== Death ==
On the evening of 1 June 2026, Master Parrot died tragically following a hit-and-run road crash along the Kampala Northern Bypass in the Masanafu/Busega area. He was struck by a speeding vehicle while attempting to cross the highway and was pronounced dead shortly after at the Mulago National Referral Hospital.

Following public viewings at the National Theatre in Kampala, he was laid to rest on 3 June 2026 in Butembe, Kamengo, Mpigi District. His final studio album, Born Sifaayo, was released posthumously on 14 August 2026 as a musical tribute to his legacy.

== Musical career ==
Master Parrot rose to prominence during the early years of Uganda's contemporary dancehall and Afro-pop scene. His breakthrough came with "Muliro", a song that received extensive airplay on Ugandan radio stations and became popular in entertainment venues across the country. He later released other notable songs, including "Ekikompola" and "Maama Wabaana".

He was among the pioneering members of Fire Base Crew, one of Uganda's most influential music collectives of the early 2000s. The group played a significant role in shaping modern Ugandan popular music and launched the careers of several artists. Following a period away from the spotlight, Master Parrot reunited with members of Fire Base Crew in 2017 and released a remix of "Muliro" alongside Mickie Wine.

In addition to his foundational years with the Fire Base Crew, Master Parrot later spent time associated with the Leone Island music camp, collaborating with Jose Chameleone on the track "Kawal". In his later career, he transitioned toward faith-based music, incorporating gospel themes into his signature dancehall style on tracks like "Wakyuusa" and "Kulabirira".

Following his passing in June 2026, his body was brought to the National Theatre in Kampala for public viewing to allow fellow musicians and fans to pay their respects. He was buried on June 3, 2026, in Butembe, Kamengo, Mpigi District, amid a large gathering of family, fans, and fellow entertainers.

== Death ==
On 1 June 2026, Master Parrot died following a traffic collision along the Kampala Northern Bypass in Masanafu in Kampala. He was struck by a speeding vehicle while attempting to cross the highway and was pronounced dead at the scene.

== Discography ==
=== Studio albums ===
- Abayaaye (2015)
- Namuleme (2015)
- Maama Wabaana (2025)
- Born Sifaayo (2026)

=== Notable singles ===
- "Muliro" (also known as "Muliro Muliro")
- "Ekikompola"
- "Maama Wabaana"
- "NFOFOLO" (2024)
- "Kanchakale" (2025)
- "Tuli Bayaye"
- "Omufirika" (also spelled "Mufilica")
- "Ntegedde"
- "Nkitegedde"
- "Namuleme"
- "Abayaaye"
- "Ayi Katonda"
- "Nankya"
- "Njagala Sente"
- "Makunika"
- "Mbiligo"
- "Anayinama"
- "Tugabane"
- "Never Lie" (2026)
- "Kalaamu" (2026)

=== Collaborations ===
- Wala (feat. Master Parrot)
- Bum Chekecha (feat. Master Parrot)
- Byo Nkolela (feat. Master Parrot)
- Muzei Tute (Kiri Bubi) (multi-artist collaboration including Master Parrot)
- Kiwani (Bobi Wine remix / Firebase related performances)
- Muliro (Rmx) – Mickie Wine collaboration
- Kampala Riddim appearance (Bum Chekecha contribution context)
- Kulabirira feat. Anatolius

== See also ==
- Bobi Wine
- Music of Uganda
- Dancehall music
- Afro-pop
- Born Sifaayo (2026)
