= Chosen Becky =

Ugandan singer, musician and songwriter

- Born: Rebecca Kukiriza; 20 February 2000 (age 26); Masaka, Uganda
- Origin: Masaka, Uganda; currently Kampala, Uganda
- Occupations: Musician, songwriter
- Years active: 2017 – present

Rebecca Kukiriza (born 20 February 2000), professionally known as Chosen Becky, is a Ugandan singer, musician, and songwriter. She is also an entertainer, comedian, wife and mother.

== Biography ==
Becky was born in Masaka the Central Region of Uganda. She is a born-again Christian.

== Music career ==
Chosen Becky was discovered by Nick Products CEO Joseph Kilangwa to the world after she impressed him at a singing competition in Masaka, Uganda. Becky started her music career in 2017 coming up with "Byabangi" as her first song. While in Masaka under her manager Ronnie and Kasim Pro, she had many songs which made her recognised by the stream media.

== Discography ==
songs
song Title	Year
Aliba Ani	2018
Bya Bangi	2018
Kyosaba	2019
Bankuzza	2019
Ebisembayo	2019
Telemundo	2019
Bankuzza	2019
Kansubire	2019

== Education ==
She attended several educational institutions, including Masaka S.S.S for O-level and A-level at St Anthony SS Kayunga in 2016.

== Personal life ==
On 16 December 2025, singer Chosen Becky married Abdul Ssekajja commonly known as Professor Ssekajja in a civil ceremony. The event was at the lakeside and the reception was held at Ovacado resort beach in Kawuku, Wakiso District. The couple's decision to opt for a civil marriage was influenced by their different religious backgrounds. Musicians including Lydia Jasmine performed at the reception.

Chosen Becky's traditional introduction (Kwanjula) to her fiancé, Ssekajja Abdul, took place on Tuesday, December 9, 2025, in Masaka, a glamorous event where her ex-lover Mutebi Amir commonly known as Dictatator Amir also sent congratulations. Rema Namakula, Spice Diana, Winnie Nwagi, Princess Amiirah and Pastor Wilson Bugembe were among the musicians who entertained the guests.

She is the mother of four children, including a daughter called Amber Grace Mirembe Mutebi, born on September 12, 2024.

== Controversies ==
In November 2021, Chosen was reportedly deported from South Africa where she was scheduled to perform because she had arrived in the country on a tourist visa and not on a work visa as required.

== See also ==
- B2C Entertainment
- Goodlyfe Crew
- Klear Kut
- Rema Namakula
