= Angela Kalule =

Ugandan musician and radio presenter (born 1977)

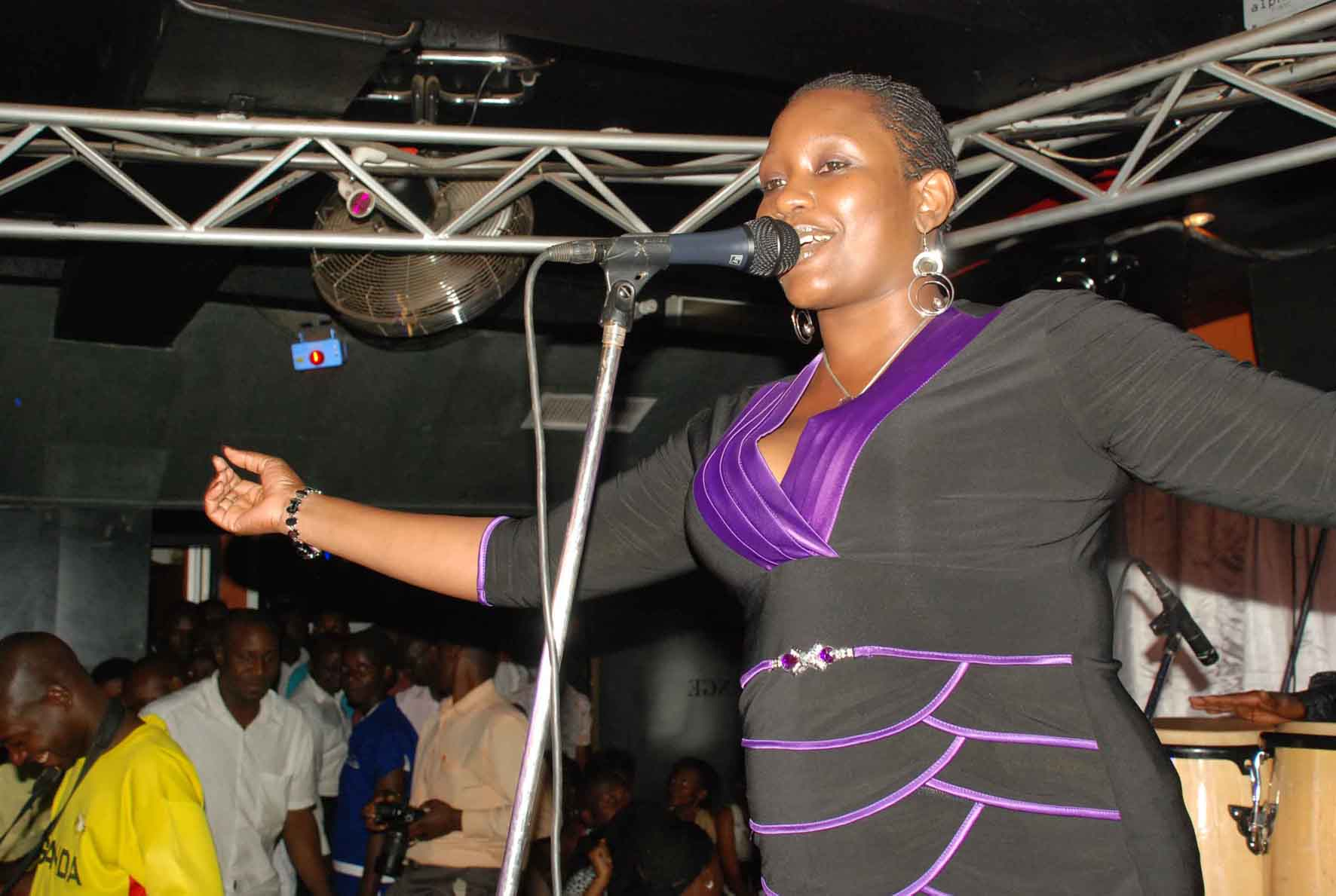
- Background information
- Born: 18 February 1977 (age 48); Uganda
- Occupations: Musician; radio presenter

Angela Kalule is a Ugandan musician and radio presenter. She won 'Song of the year' and 'Best Live Band Single' in the 2011 Pearl of Africa Music Awards.

== Biography ==
Angela Kalule was born on 18 February 1977 in Kampala, Uganda. She went to Aga Khan nursery in Nairobi, Nakasero SS from 1992 to 1993 and Mengo Senior School. She holds a bachelor's degree in information management.

She started singing in school and joined the music industry in 1997 as a backup vocalist for Kato Lubwama's Diamonds Ensemble group. It is there that she released Akamuli. In 2006, she released a six-track solo album, with two songs in English and four in Luganda. She sings in her own band called K’angie.

== Discography ==
=== Songs ===
- "Kankwekumire"
- "Katikitiki"
- "Kantuntunu"
- "Highway"
- "olimi Ssukkali"

=== Albums ===
- Dark Chocolate
- Kakondo

== Awards and recognition ==
- Song of the year in the Pearl of Africa Music Awards 2011 for "Katikitiki"
- Best live band single in the Pearl of Africa Music Awards 2011 for "Katikitiki"
