= Namakula Mary Bata =

Ugandan songwriter

Mary Bata
- Born: Namakula Mary; 22 December 1993 (age 31); Mulago Uganda
- Occupation(s): Songwriter, Musician & Actor
- Years active: 2014–present
- Known for: Singing and Acting
- Label: Present: Mary Bata Music (MBM)

Namakula Mary, (born 22 December 1993), commonly known as Mary Bata, is a Ugandan female songwriter, and artist.

== Background ==
Bata attended Kabata Primary School, Maky College Secondary School Nateete and went to YMCA where she studied, and was awarded a diploma in Cosmetology & Designing in 2013.

== Music career ==
Bata started as a singer in a church choir before joining Kream Productions Band in 2013. In 2014 released her breakthrough song “Disappointment” and this song brought her to the limelight of Ugandan music. She had her first concert on 28 August 2015 at Theatre La Bonita in Kampala and it was a success.

=== Studio albums ===
List of studio albums with selected details
Title	Details
Salute	Released: 2014; Label: Kream Production; Formats: Digital download
Tugenda Komawa	Released: 2017; Label: Rydim Empire; Formats: Digital download
Madowadowa	Released: 2018; Label: Mary Bata; Formats: Digital download

== Discography ==
Songs
Song title	Year
Disappointment	2014
Visa	2014
Landlord	2014
Salute	2015
Hug	2015
Waliwo Ekibaanja	2016
Tugenda Komawo	2016
Sembela	2016
Ndugudde	2016
Give me Time	2016
Respect	2016
Okimanyi	2017
Mulimu Ki	2017
Madowadowa	2018
Am Ready	2018
Akayimba	2019
Follow You	2020
Kookonyo	2020

== Personal life ==
In August 2017, Mary survived an accident while she was on her way back from Mityana to Kampala.

== Awards and nominations ==
Year	Award	Category	Nominee(s)	Result	Ref.
2015	Rising Stars Award	Best Band Song “Disappointment”	Mary Bata	Won	
2017	HiPipo Music Awards	Best Band Song “Sembela”	Mary Bata	Won	
2018	HiPipo Music Awards	Best Band Song of The Year “Tugenda Komawa”	Mary Bata	Nominated	
