= David Lutalo =

Ugandan musician

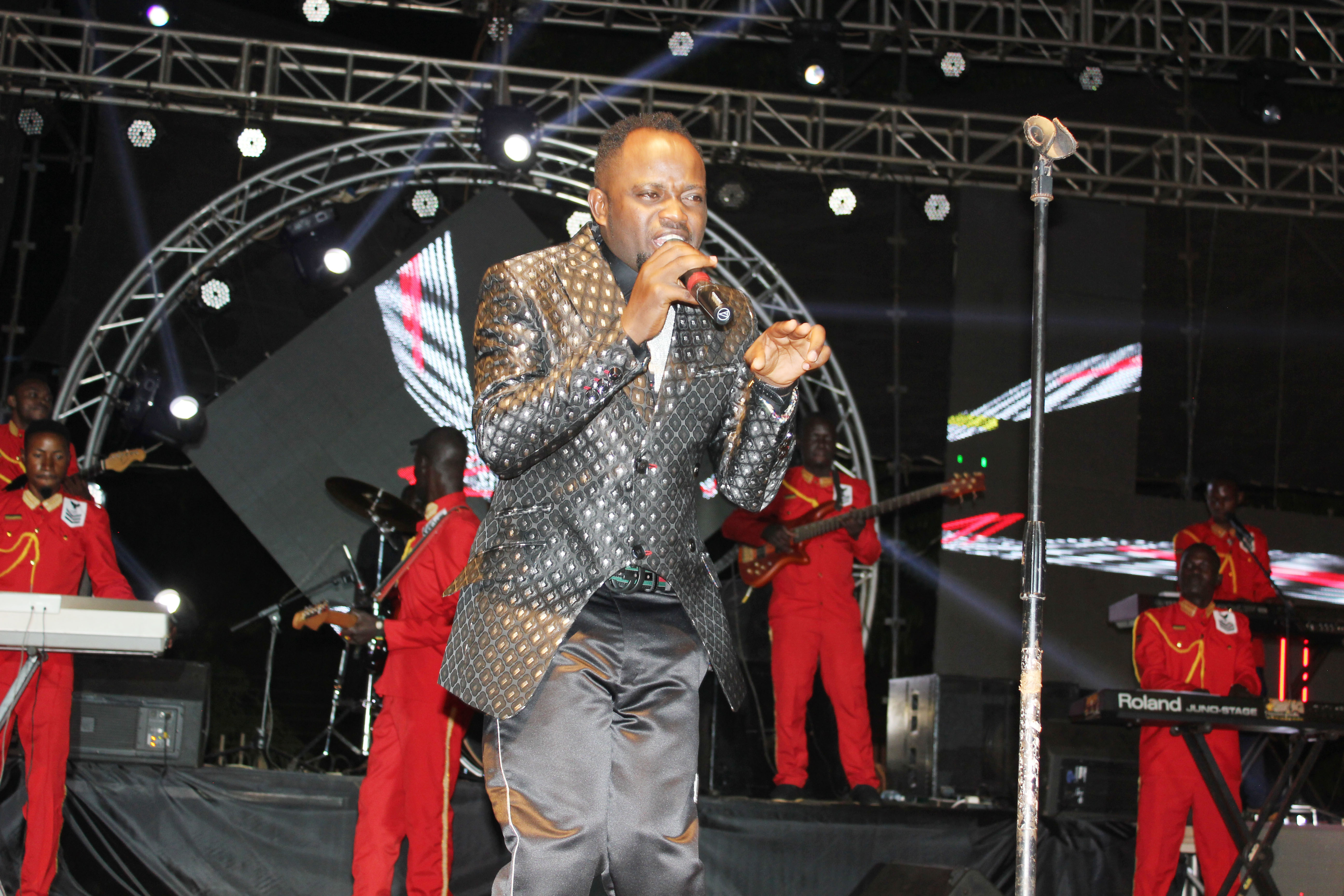
- David Lutalo on stage in 2017

Background information
- Born: David Lutalo; 8 March 1986 (age 40); Luwero, Uganda
- Origin: Luwero
- Genres: Afro pop, Afrobeat, Ugandan Vocalist
- Occupations: Singer, Song Writer & Composer
- Years active: 2007–present
- Label: Da Hares
- Website: www.davidlutalomusic.com

David Lutalo (born 8 March 1986), is a Ugandan musician, artist and performer from East Africa, who rose to fame fifteen years back with his hit Kapapaala in 2008, released under his own Record Label "Da Hares". He started recording music in 2008 and has several solo songs to his name as well as several collaborations with Eddy Kenzo, Bebe Cool, and Goodlyfe Crew, Solid Star.

Lutalo is known by Uganda's music audiences for his distinct, high-toned, sharp voice which has made him a favorite among rural and urban Ugandans. He has been rated in some circles as the unofficial Ugandan musician of the year in 2014. In 2013, Lutalo joined hands with Mowzey Radio and Weasle of Goodlyfe Crew and they produced Hellena song. In 2014, he collaborated with a young musician Maro, Mubbi bubi. David Lutalo release song "Kabisi Ka Ndagala" video. In January 2016, he won the Best Male Artist and the Artist of the Year awards at the HiPipo Music Awards ceremony.

== Early life and education background ==
David Lutalo, was born to Luggya Robinson (father) and Mastula Nassazi (mother) in Luweero district and is well known for his ability to sing fluently in Luganda language, Swahili language, and some bit English Language. He attended quite a number of schools like Kikunyu Primary school, Balitta Lwogi Primary School where he attained his Primary Leaving Examination (PLE), then he joined Kasana Town Academy Luwero for his high school studies, where he attained his Uganda Certificate of Education (UCE), and after David went to Busisa Grammar for his A-Level education but he left school without completing his A-level.

== Discography ==
David Lutalo has a series of songs to his name including:

1. Kapaapaala
2. Gyetugenda
3. Wajetugenda
4. Yamba
5. Magumba
6. Manya
7. I love you
8. Pretty
9. So Nice
10. Kwasa
11. Eat zote
12. Mile
13. Akantu
14. Nakusiima
15. Onsanula
16. Tugende
17. Ensi
18. Silivia
19. Awo
20. Tokutula
21. Am in Love
22. Kabisi Ka Ndagala
23. Mboona
24. Yankutudde
25. Engrid
26. Amelida
27. Nkwagalira Ddala
28. Ffe Byagaana
29. Yokoto
30. Holy
31. Nalongo
32. Salawo
33. Byonkola
34. Babongote
35. Ngondera
36. Love Commissioner
37. Nkwale
38. Bwemba Naawe
39. Kiwedde
40. KoKo
41. Red Tomato
42. Mama
43. Ujuwe
44. Lewo
45. That's why
46. Cissy
47. All what she needed
48. Yesu Christo

== See also ==
- List of Ugandan musicians
