= Sophie Nantongo =

Sophie Nantongo Nee Bisegerwa
- Genres: Afro pop, Pop culture
- Years active: 2000 with The Stone Band. 2002-2003 with Engles Production. 2005- present solo artist
- Spouse: Sam Ssimbwa.
- Award: Best Female Artists of the Year 2007 (Pam Awards)

Sophie Nantongo (born 1983) also known as Hajjat Sophie Nantongo or Nee Bisegerwa, is a Ugandan Afro pop/Pop culture singer, songwriter and actress. She became known in early 2002 after being discovered by Eagles productions, at the time she was singing with Stone band in 2000.

After leaving Eagles productions, Nantongo took 2003 off to rest, she felt as if no one was listening to her since she had no new music.

In 2004, she launched a solo career with the Liberty album reintroducing her as a solo artist, she later ventured into passion fruit farming.

Throughout her music career, Nantongo has managed to empower women through and songs and other initiatives.

In 2025 she held a concert to celebrate her journey in the music industry at Kampala Serena Hotel.

== Early life and education ==
Sophie Nantongo was born to Erias Bisegerwa and Sarah Bisegerwa in Kasubi, a Kampala suburb in Lubaga divisionon 10 October 1983. She is the last-born of the family with two siblings. She was born to a Muslim father and an Adventist mother, she and the siblings spent most of their time with their mother since their father was busy.

Nantongo attended Nakasero primary during her nursery level, Namugongo Girls Boarding Primary school, Gombe secondary school for her O'level and Agha Khan secondary school for her A'level. She dreamed of becoming a pilot, but her voice introduced her to a different career.

== Music career ==
Nantongo began her singing career in primary school singing in the school choir.

In 2000, she stepped on stage for the first time at a pub in Namasuba along Entebbe road, during a live performance by the Power pro band, a friend (Syliva Nabukenya) of Sophie Nantongo asked the band if her friend could perform one song which they agreed. She later performed Judy Boucher's "Send Me The Pillow".

After two weeks, she was asked to join the Stone Band which was performing at Sabrina's Pub. Here she was paid sh170,000 per month. This fee was later raised to sh 250,000 per month. She used her first payment to buy a phone(Nokia 5110).

In 2002, she joined the Eagles Productions as the lead female vocalist but before that Meshach Semakula took her to record her album. During her stay at Eagles productions, they combined acting and singing but her stay at the production was rather short. Nantongo left the Eagles productions after a year of not being paid and feeling exploited.

In 2004, Nantongo launched a solo career with the Liberty album. The songs were written by Sylver Kyagulanyi.

In July 2007, she launched her third album titled Amaggwa Ku Meeme at Hotel Equatorial. She was accompanied by fellow musicians from different music genres like Juliana Kanyomoozi, Bobi Wine also known as Robert Kyagulanyi Sentamu, Hilderman, and others.

During her performance on 2 May 2025 concert at Kampala Serena hotel, Nantongo invited her husband Sam Ssimbwa to join her on stage adding an extra layer of excitement to the crowd.

== Discography ==
=== Albums ===
- Liberty album (2003)
- Omutindo album (2016)

=== Singles ===
- Wansumulula
- Twagala win
- Tuvuganye
- Ekisanja
- Twala
- Entalo Mumaka
- Love super
- Akambayaya
- Kkatala
- First born
- Kankwagale
- Gwabikola
- Love super

== Award and nominations ==
In 2007, Nantongo was nominated for the Best Female artiste of the year, which she won.

== Personal life ==
Nantongo was married to Hajji Abdul Mubiru, also known as Hajji Kagoma, but parted ways during their separation, she sued him for a thirty million debt.

In 2011, Nantongo married Sam Ssimbwa, also known as Coach Sam Ssimbwa.

== See also ==
- Robert Kyagulanyi Sentamu
- Juliana Kanyomoozi
- Iryn Namubiru
- Irene Ntale
- Sylver Kyagulanyi
