= Master Blaster (musician) =

- Born: Cornelius Oloya; 1986
- Died: December 2015 (aged 28–29)
- Cause of death: Gunshots in the stomach
- Resting place: Kitgum
- Occupations: Musician Musical career
- Origin: Kitgum, Uganda
- Genres: Afrobeat; Dancehall
- Years active: 2007–2015

Master Blaster (born Cornelius Oloya) was a Ugandan dancehall musician. He rose to fame when he released the sexually suggestive song Emboko in 2007, which received massive airplay until 2012.

== Death hoax ==
Master Blaster was announced dead in March 2013 when he allegedly over drunk and passed out only to gain his consciousness later. It was also alleged that he had planned the death stunt to boost his then fading music career.

== Death ==
Master Blaster was a victim of violent chaos at a bar in Bwaise. He was shot twice in the stomach and died on 29 December 2015. His killer still remains a mystery since there are different stories as to who exactly killed the musician. He was laid to rest in Kitgum.

== Discography ==
- Embooko 2007
- Ekibala 2015

== See also ==
- Master Blaster (band) German dance band
- List of Ugandan musicians
