= 97.7 Record FM =

97.7 Record FM Uganda
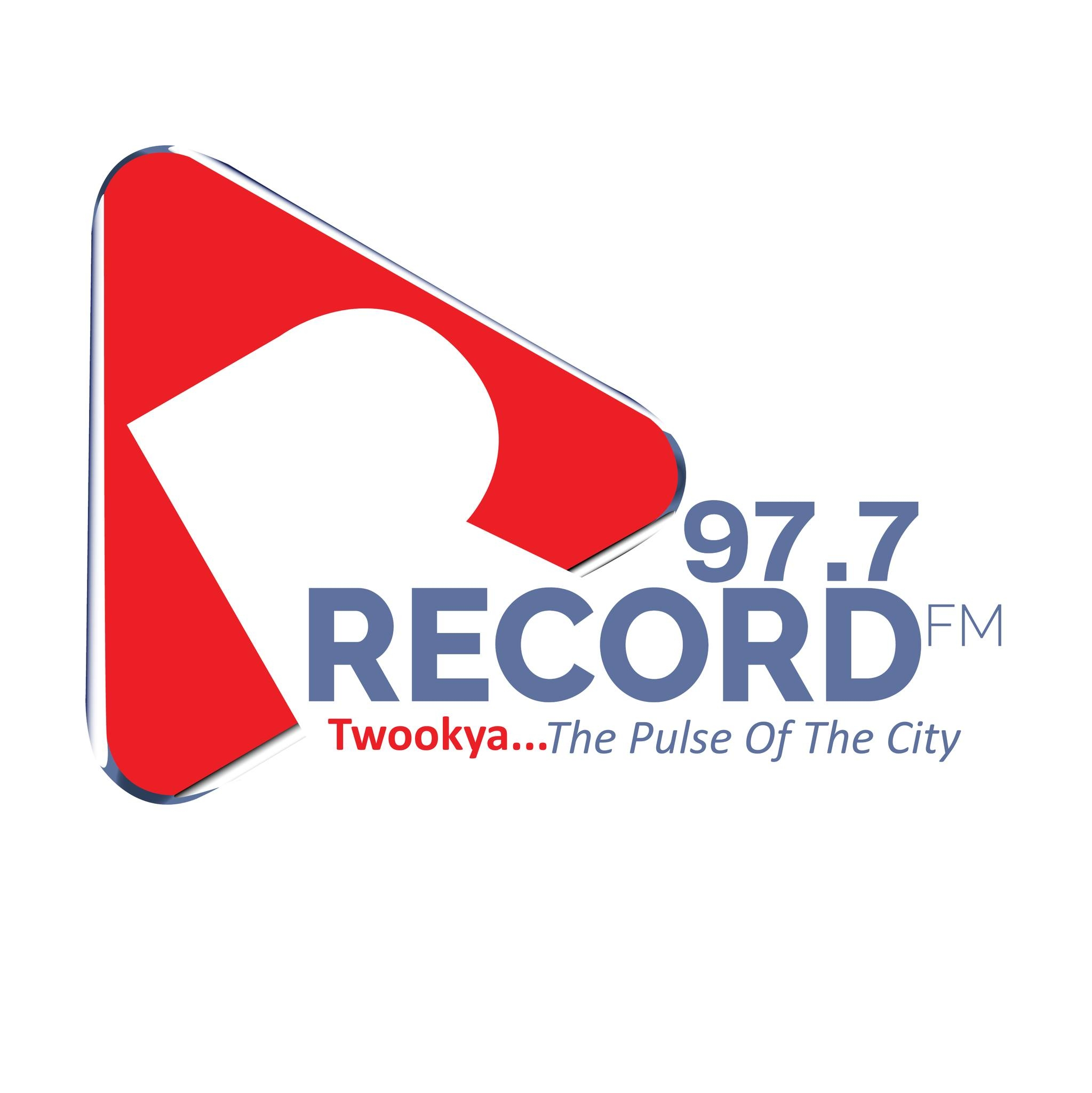
- Kampala; Uganda
- Broadcast area: Kampala, Uganda
- Frequency: 97.7 MHz

Programming
- Languages: Luganda, English, Swahili
- Format: Ugandan music, African music, News & Current Affairs
- Affiliations: Amorim Palange - Managing Director Morgan Mugabi - Station Manager DJ Erycom - Operations / Promotions Manager

Ownership
- Sister stations: RecordTV Uganda

Links
- Website: https://recordradio.co.ug/

Record FM (sometimes called Record Radio or 97.7 Record FM) is a hybrid two radio station based in Nakasero along George Road in Kampala, Uganda. Under the Brazilian free-to-air commercial television network; Record Network was established on September 27, 1953. It is related to the Brazilian-based Universal Church of the Kingdom of God. Record FM Uganda is at 97.7 MHz, formed in 2010 and covering central, western, and southern Uganda plus some of northern Uganda.

The station's slogan is "Twookya The Pulse Of The City". In 2019, 97.7 Record FM was named the Fastest Rising Youth Radio Station by EJazz Media. Bigeye.ug wrote that internally-conducted research showed that 97.7 Record FM was the most listened to station in the central region, that listeners liked the selection of music and programmed, and liked their online presence especially the audio-visual production on its digital platforms.

While its listenership had declined massively between 2020 and late 2024, In May 2025, the top management of 97.7 Record FM in Uganda contracted calm spoken Morgan Mugabi (a former radio host on Top Radio, KampalaFm and Radio 4) to take on as the radio's Station Manager and also DJ Erycom as the promotions and operations manager.
