= Maro Uganda =

Ugandan musician and songwriter (born 1987)

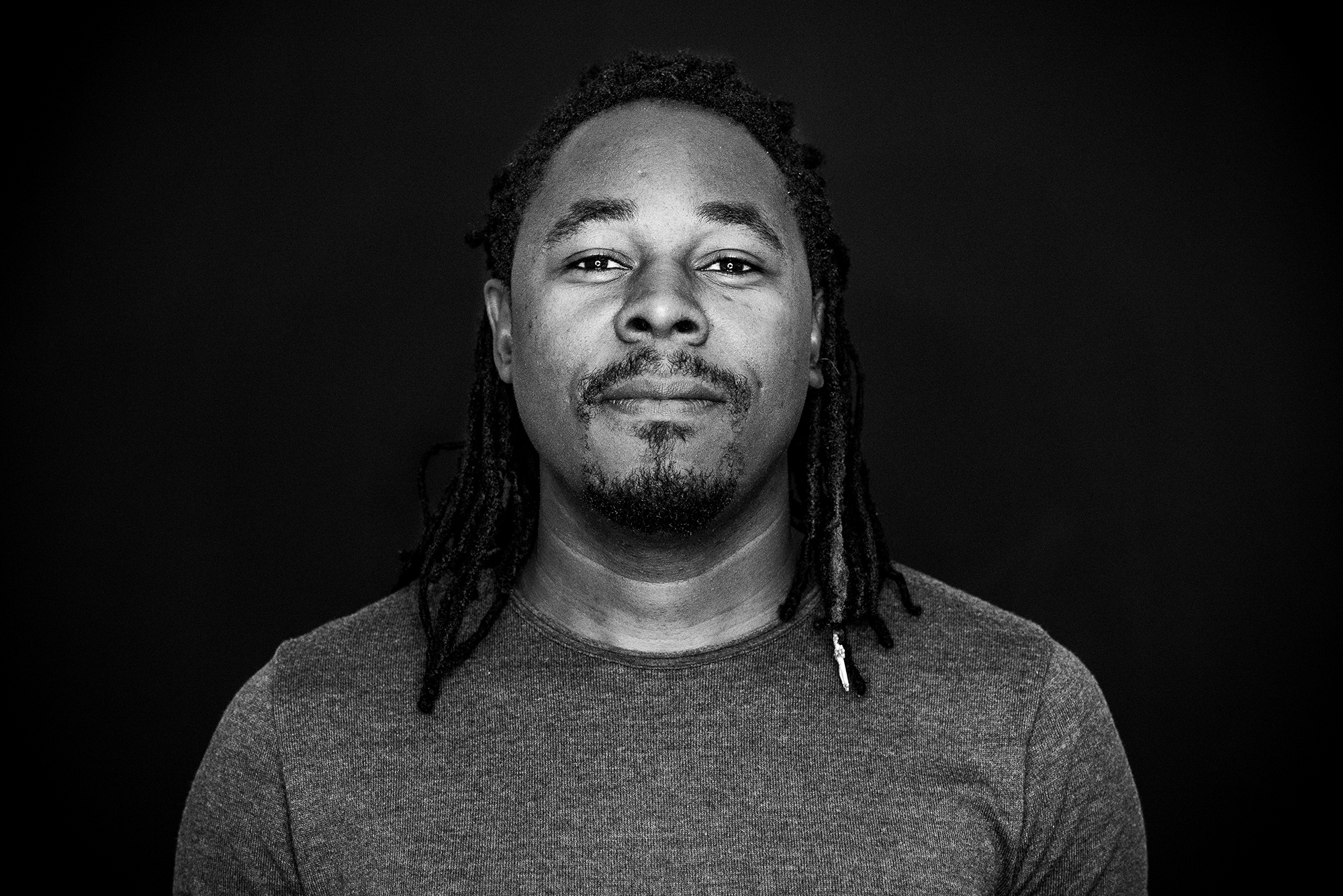

Background information
- Also known as: Maro; Ronald Magada
- Born: Ronald Magada; May 7, 1987 (age 39); Buwolero, Jinja, Uganda
- Genres: Afropop; RnB; AfroBeat
- Occupations: Musician; Music producer; Songwriter
- Instrument: Vocals
- Years active: 2007–present
- Label: Humble Management (2013–2015)

Ronald Magada (born May 7, 1987), professionally known as Maro Uganda, is an Ugandan musician, songwriter and performer, currently based in Bonn Bad godesberg Germany. He is known for his songs, "Mubbi Bubbi" featuring David Lutalo, "Rising star", "Kyokoba", "Anjagala" and has done international features like "Chip in" featuring Mark Forster and Maurice Kirya, "Imani" by BSMG, among others.

== Music career ==
Maro launched his music career in 2007, juggling between work at the cineplex cinemas garden city mall kampala, campus and got a breakthrough in 2010 with "Toneraga: ft Empress and Mikie Wine In 2011, he signed with "West end entertainment" of Aziz Azion, a prominent vocalist, writer and guitarist in Uganda and released his first single titled "Sulabulungi" meaning "Good night", a love song. This was followed by the Lusoga (his native language) hit single "Biweewo" meaning getting finished with something; in this case, with obstacles in love. His second collaboration was with Mya Baganda of the Blu*3 in 2012. He later released "Genda Ewamwe" which was one of his major hit songs in 2013 winning him a chance at his first concert that took place Freedom City in September 2013. In the same year he was nominated in the Buzz Teenies Awards and right after the successful concert, he won the award for Best collaboration of the year in the next weeks "Why" featuring Ugandan hip hop star "Gravity Omutujju at the first ever Club Music Video Awards held on the 20th September 2013. He released a single "Rising star" in celebration of his success, speaking about his journey, embedding clips of the awards ceremony and the major concert tours he had by then.

=== Studio albums ===
List of Studio Albums with selected details
Title	Details
Sula Bulungi	Released: 2011; Label: Independent; Formats: Digital download
Genda ewamwe	Released: 2013; Label: Independent; Formats: Digital download
Kyokoba	Released: 2014; Label: Maro Entertainment; Formats: Digital download
Kamboyine	Released: 2015; Label: Independent; Formats: Digital download
Atwooki	Released: 2016; Label: Independent; Formats: Digital download
#89gooddecision	Released: 25 April 2018; Label: Independent; Formats: Digital download
Departures	Released: 2020; Label: Magada Ronald; Formats: Digital download

== Early life and educational background ==
Maro was born in Buwolero village, Kagoma Sub-County in Jinja to James Magada and Janet Babuleka. His father serves in the Uganda Police Force. He is the eldest of 13 children. Maro attended Nsambya Barracks Nursery School, joined St. Peter Nsambya Primary school, did his PLE at Bupadengo Primary School in Kamuli District, White Land College (currently known as Seroma College) for one year and later joined Light College Mukono doing his UACE. Buloba High School where he sat for his UACE 2006. In 2015, Maro graduated from Makerere University with a bachelor's degree in Development Studies.

== Honors ==
Year	Award	Category	Nominee(s)	Result	Ref.
2015	Uganda Music Awards	Best AfroPop Song	Nzirango	Nominated	
2015	Uganda Music Awards	Best Regional Artiste	Central	Won	
2016	HiPipo Awards	Best Hiphop Song	Eh Mama	Won	
2016	HiPipo Music Awards	Best R&B Song	Addicted	Won	
2016	HiPipo Music Awards	Best Afrobeat Song	Kamboyine	Nominated	
2019	HiPipo Music Awards	Best RnB Song	Nsiima ft. Remah	Nominated	
2020	HiPipo Music Awards	Best RnB Song	Anjagala	Nominated	

== Community works ==
He is an active member of VIVA CONAGUA (an international NGO based in Germany) providing clean water, promoting sanitation and proper hygiene through art and sport. He has worked with Uganda Hands For Hope Namuwongo, Uganda Women Cancer Support Organisation, Inter Aid on Refugees and Plan International (Uganda) with emphasis on empowerment of girls.
