= Maureen Nantume =

Ugandan musician

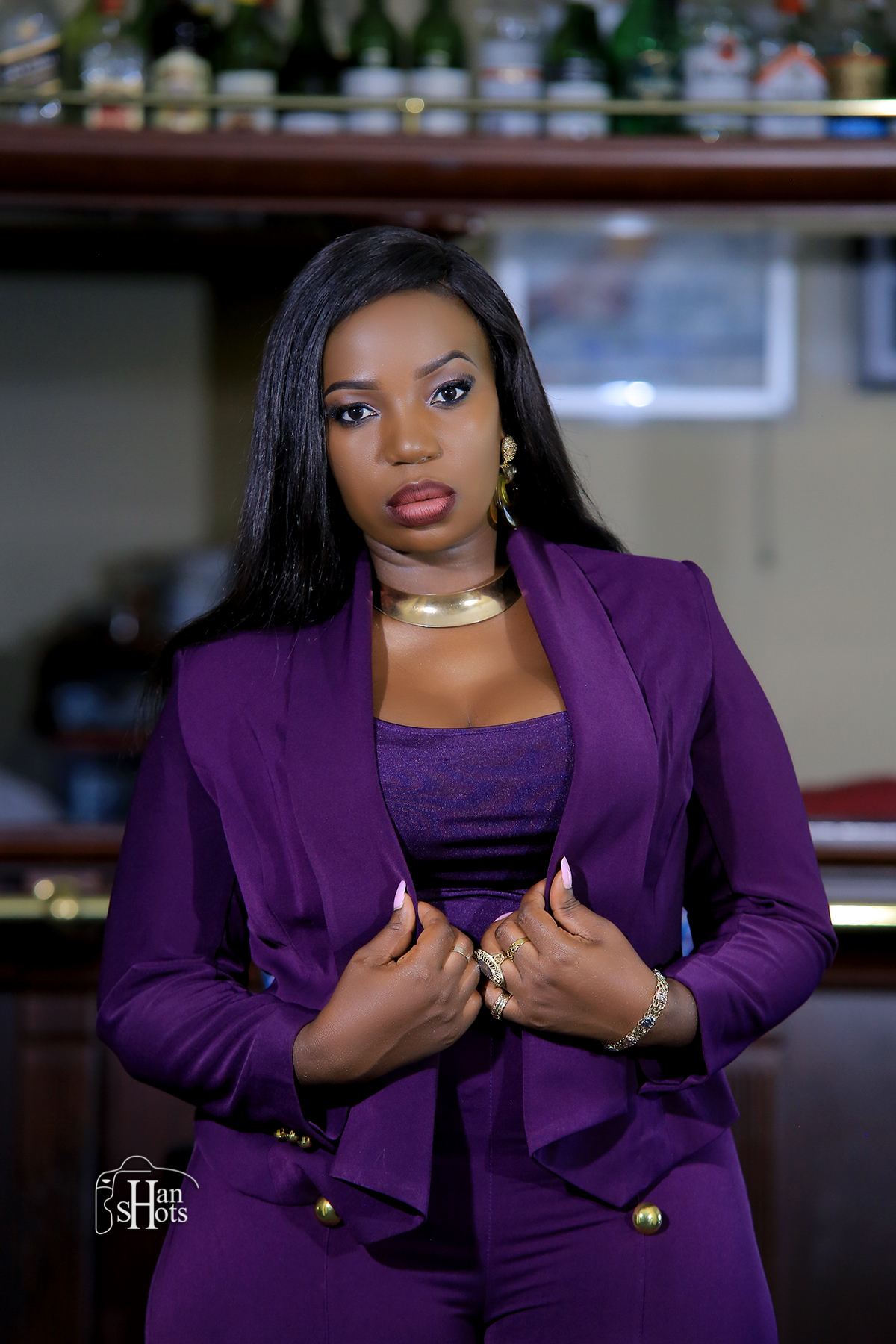
- Maureen Nantume
- Born: April 18, 1984 (age 42)
- Citizenship: Ugandan
- Education: Agro-Links Secondary School
- Occupation: Musician
- Organization: Golden Band
- Known for: Ugandan Female Musician
- Mother: Late Robina Nakitende
- Awards: Hipipo Awards

Maureen Nantume (born on April 18, 1984) is a Ugandan singer under the Golden Band which emerged from Eagles Production.

== Background and education ==
Maureen Nantume was born to the late Robina Nakitende who died in 1996. She went to Agro-Links secondary school located at Namasuba and dropped out in Senior Three in 2002 .She worked as a maid in Namasuba while earning a monthly salary of Ugandan shillings 15,000 per month for three years.

== Career ==
Nantume performed in a television program as a maid reflecting her first job. Her career as a musician came to life in years of 2000 with songs like Webale kufumba, abakozi ba safari, kenfunye gwe and byakola. In 2003, Nantume joined the Eagles Production Band where she began singing as a backup singer as well as a dancer.In 2004, she released her first single called Siri ndogoyi (am not a donkey), she followed this song with Oyitirizza 2005 then, Nkwagala nnyo in 2006 and these three songs made her known by the people. Her inspiration to become a singer was influenced by singer Mariam Ndagire and Juliana Kanyomozi.

== Discography ==
- Nkuze
- Talemwa
- Kalaala
- Malidadi
- Akambe
- Siri Ndogoyi
- Maama
- Munda Eri
- Omutugunda
- Kenfunye Gwe
- Champion
- Bwoba Onjagala
- Masanda
- Nze Ani
- Oyitiriza
- Confession
- Nkuwangaaze
- Katonda Yampa
- Ekirooto Kyange
- Ntemera Ekubo
- Ndi Muzadde
- Kabani Kundongo
- Ngenze Kufumba
- Njagala Kubanawe
- Darling
- Yegwe
- Kisaganda
- Ndi Muzadde
- Nkuwangaaze
- Sweet Mutima
- Abakozi Ba Safari
- Kirooto Kyange
- Byakola
- Kiyungu
- Abantu Bakuno
- Nkuwangaaze
- Wojja Ekigere

== Awards won ==
Nantume's song Nkuzze won the best band song at Hipipo Awards in 2015. In 2019 her song (kisaaganda) with Chris Evan won the best band song at Hipipo Awards.

== Controversies ==
In 2019, singer Maureen Nantume was deported from the United States of America where she had gone to perform at a musical event at Marriot Hotel in Burlington. The event, Africa Connect had also attracted other artists including Eddy Kenzo, Charles Kasozi also known as MC Mariachi, and Desire Luzinda. She was deported because she did not have the right authorization to enter the United States of America as an artist. The event organizers including Sarah Zawedde had not secured for her a work permit to perform as an artist, and she mentioned that she was heading to the US to attend a birthday party.

== See also ==
- List of Ugandan artists
- Sheeba kirungi
- Winnie Nwagi
