= Asha Naava Zziwa =

Naava Grey performing at a concert in Kampala.

AAsha Naava Zziwa (born March 18, 1987), alias Naava Grey, is a Ugandan musician, songwriter, and businesswoman who performs songs in multiple languages, including Zulu, Zambian, Nigerian, English, and Luganda.

== Early life and education ==
Naava was born to the late Prince Mulondo and late Princess Ndagire Tracy. Her maternal grandfather was half Irish, half Muganda. She is the last born of five who grew up looking up to her older siblings, whom she thought were better than her because they were multi-talented and when it came to music, they were perfect. Her father was both an artiste and also a businessman who used to draw and paint. Their first-born plays cricket and they have doctors, but they all love music more. She would take a song to her sister who would criticize her that it is lacking, which made her feel scared to go out and sing before an audience even at school.

Naava went to Buganda Road Primary School, then Kibuli Secondary School, for one year. She also studied for a degree in Information Technology at Makerere University.

== Career ==
In 2008, her family urged her to go for the Tusker Project Fame 2 competition where she passed the auditions and finished as a semifinalist in the top 10 contestants. Through the Tusker Project competition, she interacted with many International artistes which made her learn how to write songs and also met with music producer Steve Jean through GNL Zamba.

Steve Jean introduced her to producer Michael Fingers who had just returned from the United Kingdom and wanted to start a production house. Michael Fingers introduced her to the different beats he had made, among them was New Day Beat which became Nteredde beat.

In 2013, Naava signed with Sony Music Entertainment Africa and Rockstar 4000 Music Entertainment for publishing and distribution of her music. She shared a stage with International artistes at a fest in South Africa in 2014 when she had just released Soka Lami.

Naava conceptualized "Ninga Omuloge" in 2009 when she was in a breakup and completed its recording in 2012. Some of her hits include "Ninga Omuloge", "Soka Lami", "Aliba Omu", "Nja Kwagala" and "Nteredde".

=== Maiden concert ===
Naava held her maiden concert on 14 February 2025 at Kampala Serena hotel a show that sold out. She started off the show with the song that introduced her to the music industry called Aliba Waani, followed by I Do, Love Eyo a ballad with a touch of zouk. She was joined by Bruno K for Aliwa , Mun-G to perform Champion and Ssejjusa. In the second session of her performance, she started with singing Alibeera Omu, Soka Lami which made all of her fans to stand up to sing and dance along.She kicked off her final session with her most popular song Ninga Omuloge, joined by Joshua Baraka and performed Dalilah and closed off her show at midnight with Nteredde.

=== Music album ===
In 2015, Naava released a 20-track album titled Naava Grey: The Album, which she started working on since the release of her first song "Aliba Wani" in 2011. The album was a product of various producers such as Andy Music, Alshizzo, Micheal Fingers, D King, Josh Wonder, Chali Mulalami and Ogopa Butterfly.

== Personal life ==
Naava divorced with her husband Henry Mzili with whom she had a daughter named Acte Joyce, whom she gave birth to at 18 years. She fears being alone and being surrounded by strangers. Naava has a farm in Jinja where she rears goats and chicken. She likes eating chicken and her favorite drinks are water and juice. She is also interested in fashion design and Bollywood movies.

== Discography ==
Singles

- Ninga Omuloge
- Aliba Waani
- Nkwetaga
- Nteredde
- Kangume
- Twala
- Nja Kwagala
- Nvuuma
- Collaborations
- Naava Grey ft Kenneth Mugabi - Owuwo
- Naava Grey ft Speedy - Sokalami
- Naava Grey ft GNL Zamba - Make a wish
- Naava Grey ft Bruno K - Aliwa

== Awards and honours ==
- Nominated in Club Music Video Awards(CMVAs)
- Nominated in the Special Effects Category
- Nominated in the New Comer and Video of the Year
- Nominated in the 2016 HiPipo Music Awards winning Best R&B song.
- Nominated in he fifth annual BEFFTA Awards under Best International Act category

== See also ==
- Juliana Kanyomozi
- Stecia Mayanja
- Jackie Chandiru
