= Kataleya and Kandle =

Ugandan musical duo

- Origin: Kampala, Uganda
- Genres: Afrobeat; pop; Zouk
- Years active: 2021-date
- Members: Kataleya; Kandle

Kataleya & Kandle is a Ugandan music duo consisting of the Kataleya & Kandle. The duo holds the distinction of being Uganda's first female music duo. They are managed by Theron Music Records since 2021.

== History ==
Before joining the music industry, Kataleya and Kandle met each other at a birthday party and became close friends. Kataleya and Kandle competed in a music competition before receiving the once-in-a-lifetime opportunity that altered their lives. They were discovered and signed by a music and events label in 2021. Kataleya and Kandle hit the Ugandan music market as the new female singing duo with the release of their debut single "Muzibe wa Love" in 2021 after joining Theron Music. Kataleya and Kandle are Uganda's first female musical duo.

=== Kataleya ===
Born Namakula Hadijah on 19 December 1999. She attended Apostolic Primary School, Mengo then Noah's Ark lugazi for her High School certificate.

=== Kandle ===
Nabatuusa Rebecca (born 22 February 1998) commonly known as Kandle, she studied from Bunamwaya C/U Primary School and Kyambogo College for her high school education. and got pregnant.

== Discography ==
- Kyolina 2022
- Nkunonya 2022
- Pain Killer 2022
- Do Me 2021
- Tonnafuya 2021
- Muzibe wa Love 2021
