= Eddy Yawe =

Ugandan musician (born 1980)

- Born: 11 May 1980 (age 46); Gomba District
- Citizenship: Ugandan
- Education: Kinoni Primary School, St. Henry's College Kitovu, Morgan university and Baltimore university
- Occupations: Artist(vocalist), sound engineer, music producer, songwriter, a politician and entrepreneur
- Organization: Dream studios
- Relatives: Bobi Wine

Eddy Yawe Sentamu (born 11 May 1980) is a Ugandan musician, vocalist for Afrigo Band and also a politician. Sentamu is also the founder of Dream Studios, a music production studio-based in Kamokya Kampala which was founded in 2003 .

== Early life and education ==
Eddy Yawe was born on 11 May 1980 to the late Jackson Willington Ssentamu and is an elder brother to Bobi Wine in a family of 34. Eddy Yawe was raised in Kinoni, Gomba District and started his education from Kinoni Primary School for his primary education and then joined St. Henry's College Kitovu for his secondary education. He then went to Netherlands where he had his University education from and later attained his master's degree in radio and television. He also studied sound engineering from Morgan State University and University of Baltimore in the United States after getting a scholarship and after an internship from Hollywood.

== Career ==
Eddy Yawe started singing when he joined Kinoni church choir in 1997 after his secondary education. He and two others formed a music band called Dimension 2000, through which they connected to different artists. Eddy Yawe released his first album, Pamela, while he was in Netherlands for studies. After moving to the US, he started Dream Studio, which he transferred to Uganda after moving back.

== Political career ==
In 2006 Ugandan general elections, Eddy Yawe supported the Democratic Party and campaigned for Erias Lukwago, who contested for Kampala Central Division Member of Parliament (MP) and is as of 2022 the lord mayor of Kampala.

In 2011, Eddy Yawe himself contested for the Kampala Central Division MP on a Democratic Party card, but lost to Muhammad Nsereko, who was running on an National Resistance Movement card.

In 2016, Eddy Yawe ran for MP of the Kira Municipality, where he lost to Semuju Nganda, who was running on Forum for Democratic Change card.

== Discography ==
Sentamu's songs include:

- Akayembe
- Tukigale
- Neighbour
- Kati olaba
- Nantongo
- Love yoo
- Uganda Yaffe ffena
- Kampala
- Tugende Kampala
- Maria Roza
- Suubi
- Anvilideyo
- Awangale
- Tomutemyako
- Irene
- Mbu madam
- Aningi ningi
- Embeera
- Neteze

== Controversy ==
In April 2011, Eddy Yawe appeared before Buganda Road Court in Kampala after being charged with inciting violence, unlawful assembly and malicious damage to property to which cases he denied and was granted bail.

== Personal life ==
Eddy Yawe is a brother to a presidential candidate and musician Kyagulanyi Sentamu Robert, better known as Bobi Wine.

== See also ==
- Bobi Wine
- Angella Katatumba
- Eddy Kenzo
- King Saha
- Giovanni Kiyingi
- Cleopatra Koheirwe
