= Henry Tigan =

- Born: Henry Tony Kirumaganyi
- Citizenship: Ugandan
- Occupations: Reggae and afro beats artist
- Notable work: He has collaborated musically with Marlon Usher, Bobi Wine and Mighty Mistic
- Awards: Best new artist Pearl of Africa Music Awards, 2008, nominated for Best reggae artist or group Pearl of Africa Music Awards, 2007

Henry Tigan, born Henry Tony Kirumaganyi, is a Ugandan reggae and afro beats artist.

== Music ==
Tigan has collaborated with Marlon Usher. Bobi Wine and Mighty Mistic. He has had hit songs like "Emiranga", "Muzudde", "Abogezi", "Lwaki Oninza", "Waddawa", "Nsiimye Gwe", "Empisazo" and "Aneganye".

== Discography ==
=== Songs ===
- Abogezi
- My country
- Waddawa
- Emilanga
- Aneganye

== Awards and recognition ==
- Best new artist Pearl of Africa Music Awards, 2008
- Nominated for best reggae artist or group Pearl of Africa Music Awards, 2007
