= Babaluku =

Ugandan musician

- Born: Silas Babaluku Balabyekkubo; 1979 (age 46–47); Uganda
- Citizenship: Canada
- Education: Bachelors Degree in Sound Engineering
- Alma mater: British Columbia academy Vancouver
- Occupations: Rapper; musician; producer; activist; entrepreneur
- Known for: Luga flow Revolution, Founder of the Bavubuka Foundation, Son of Pastor Deogratious Balabyekkubo
- Movement: Member of the Bataka squad
- Parents: Pastor Deogratious Balabyekkubo (father); Christine Balabyekkubo (mother)
- Awards: 2007 Pearl of Africa Award for Best Hip Hop Single. 2007 Buzz Teen Awards for Best Hip Hop Artist. Best audience Choice Award at Dances With Films Festival for the documentary "Diamonds in the Rough" Best Feature Documentary at Peace on Earth Film Festival for the documentary "Diamonds in the Rough". Honoured in 2010 Babaluku by the Uganda Canadian Cultural Association for his Excellence. Pioneer of the Year by the Words Beats & Life Remix Teach-In Awards
- Website: www.bavubukacommunity.blogspot.com

Babaluku, born Silas Babaluku Balabyekkubo, is a Ugandan rapper, musician, producer, community youth activist and social entrepreneur who raps in Luganda. He is a member of the Bataka Squad. He is the founder of "the Bavubuka Foundation which equips the youth with leadership skills". He is one of the pioneers of "Lugaflow" which is rap music in Luganda. He was featured in a 2008 documentary "Diamonds in the Rough: A Ugandan Hip-hop Revolution" that covered his journey from his crew’s early days of performing in Uganda to performing in at festivals in the United States of America.

== Early life and education ==
Bababuluku was born in Kampala, Uganda in 1979. He is the first born of eight children to the late Pastor Deo Balabyekkubo and Mrs Christine Balabyekubo. He went to Emen Memorial and Molly and Paul Primary schools in Makindye and eventually left for Canada when he was 12 years old. He is a graduate of sound engineering from British Columbia academy in Vancouver.

== Music ==
Babaluku started his music career in 1994. He is one of the pioneers of Lugaflow, which is rap in Luganda. He has a number of awards including a Pearl of Africa Award for Best Hip Hop Single and Buzz Teen Awards for Best Hip Hop Artist. The documentary "Diamonds in the Rough" in which he featured, won the Audience Choice Award at Dances With Films Festival and Best Feature Documentary at Peace on Earth Film Festival. In 2010 Babaluku was honored by the Ugandan Cultural Association for his Excellence and also chosen as Pioneer of the Year by the Words Beats & Life Remix Teach-In Awards.

== Discography ==
- Luga flow revolution

== Awards and recognition ==
- 2007 Pearl of Africa Award for Best Hip Hop Single
- 2007 Buzz Teen Awards for Best Hip Hop Artist.
- Best audience Choice Award at Dances With Films Festival for the documentary "Diamonds in the Rough"
- Best Feature Documentary at Peace on Earth Film Festival for the documentary "Diamonds in the Rough".
- Honoured in 2010 Babaluku by the Uganda Canadian Cultural Association for his Excellence
- Pioneer of the Year by the Words Beats & Life Remix Teach-In Awards.
