= Grace Nakimera =

Ugandan gospel musician (born 1985)

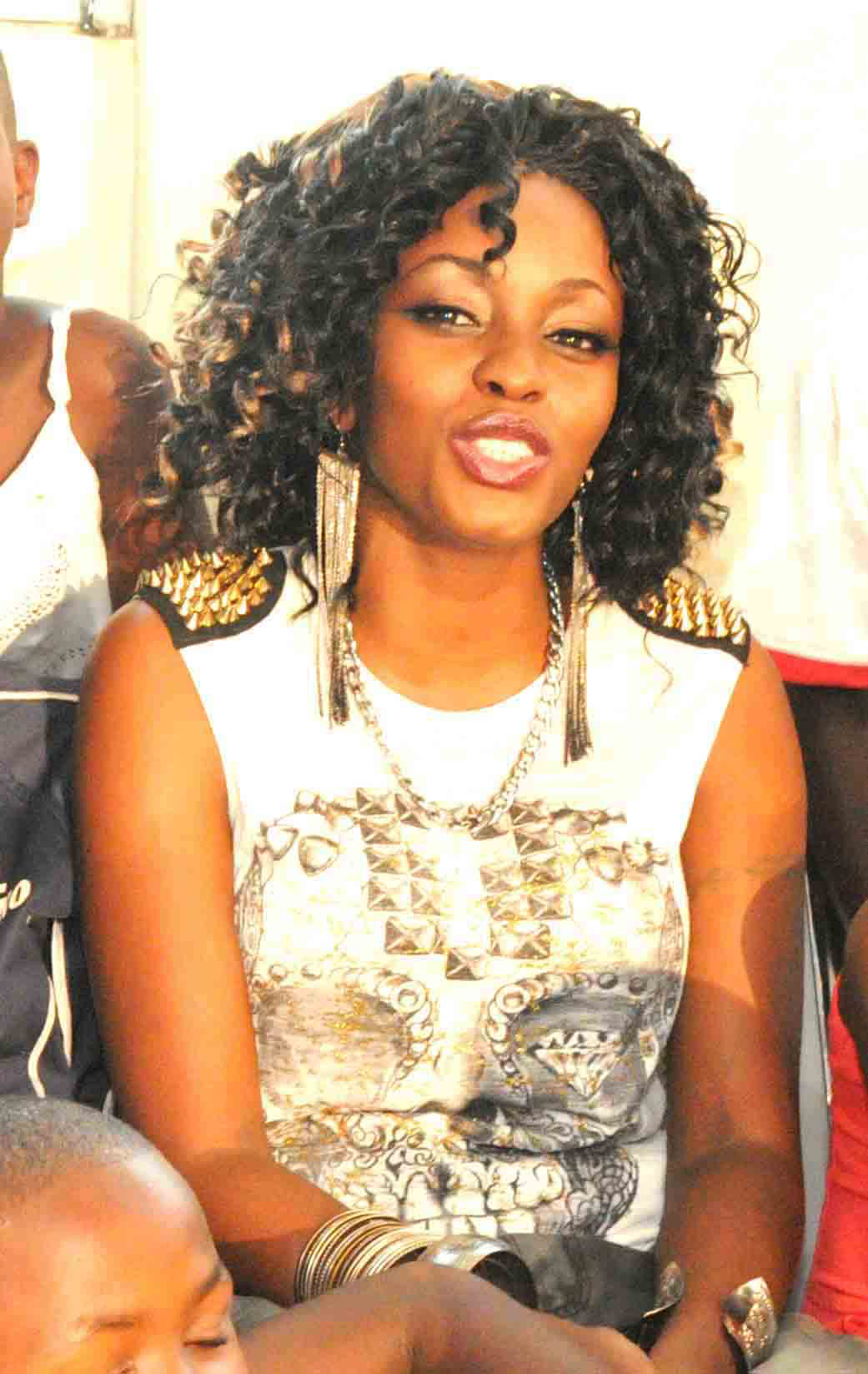
- Born: 1985 (age 40–41); Uganda
- Occupation: musician
- Musical career
- Genres: Pop; Rock; World; Dancehall
- Years active: 2004–present

Grace Nakimera is a Ugandan gospel musician, dancer, composer, and songwriter. Born on 2 February 1985, to Mr David Kalema and Ms Rose Nabulya, Grace attended Bat Valley Primary School and Old Kampala Senior Secondary School. She later enrolled for a course at the Revlon Beauty School in Nairobi.

== Music ==
Grace started singing when she was seven years old. She would perform at talent shows in Kampala. When she was 18, she travelled to Rwanda and for two years performed with the resident band at Mille collin hotel in Kigali, the hotel featured in the "Hotel Rwanda" movie about the genocide in Rwanda. In 2000, she returned to Kampala and joined Christ the King church choir. In 2004, she got a big break in music. She collaborated with a singing duo Gatimo and Paragon to record “Ani Akumanyi” a song that became the a hit in Uganda. The trio won the upcoming Artists Award in the Pearl of Africa Music Awards 2004/5. She embarked on a solo career when the group split. She has since released hits songs like “Anfuukula,” “Kiva Kuki”, “Sukuma”, “Nvawo Nawe”, “Kawoonawo". and the rock gospel song "Onyambanga"

Nakimera is also a business owner and has a daughter.

== Discography ==
=== Singles ===
- Katika
- Ani Akumanyi
- Kawonawo
- Nvawo Nawe
- Mpola Mpola
- Nkwagala Kufa
- Sexy
- Onyambanga mukama
- Anfukuula
- Kiva Kuki
- Sukuma
- Welaga Ki
- Some More
- Ntandika
- Bumper ku Bumper
- Nalo
- Seesa
- Baagala Kiki
- Riziki Yo
- Twala Byange
- Tuseyeya

=== Albums ===
- Kawonawo

== See also ==
- Jackie Chandiru
- Cindy Sanyu
- Lillian Mbabazi
