= Isaiah Katumwa =

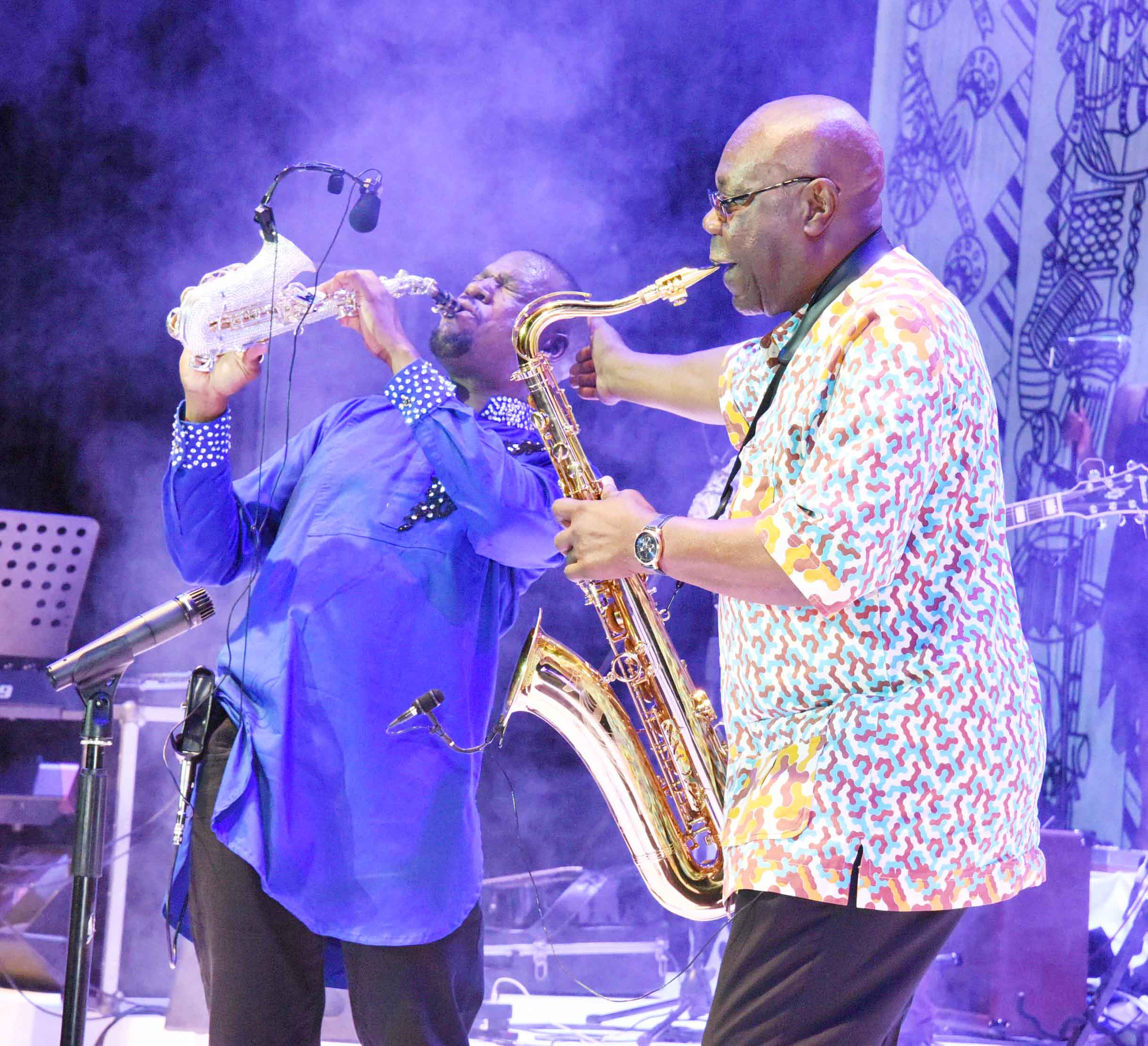
- Born: Uganda
- Musical career
- Genres: Jazz
- Instrument: Saxophone
- Years active: 2001–present

Isaiah Katumwa is a Ugandan jazz musician and saxophonist. He presents a weekly program on NTV Uganda, called "Jazz with Isaiah". He is credited for turning many people in Uganda into jazz enthusiasts. He has been hosted on BBC, Africa Magic TV, DSTV’s Studio 53 and on Mnet. He has shared a stage or opened performances for Manu Dibango, Jonathan Butler, Miriam Makeba, Yvonne Chaka Chaka, Oliver Mtukudzi, Phil Driscoll, Alvin Slaughter, and Béla Fleck The Flecktones.

== Early life and education ==
Katumwa was born to the late Samalie Muwanga Kisakye. He had a difficult childhood. By the time he was twelve, he was working to raise his school fees. He went to Rev. John Foundation School and did a music dance and drama course at the university. He proceeded to the United Kingdom where he qualified as a Sound Engineer.

== Music ==
Katumwa is a self-taught saxophonist who made a breakthrough in music through his album Sinza in 2006 which featured on the BBC. He has performed alongside popular Ugandan musicians/outfits like the Afrigo Band, Eagle's Production, Ndere troupe, Crossroads Band, Fred Sebatta, Paulo Kafeero, Juliana Kanyomozi, Mariam Ndagire and Steve Jean. Katumwa has also worked in conjunction with actors like Alex Mukulu, Kato Lubwama, and Abbey Mukiibi.

Katumwa's musical journey started when he was 10 years old while at Rev. John Foundation School. He was involved in a lot in the school music activities and inter-school competitions. The school director taught him how to play different musical instruments like the guitar. He was actively involved in the school brass band while doing folk music on the side. He taught himself how to play the saxophone while still in Primary school. When he went to secondary he started studying music while playing in the Primary school Brass Band. This became a job for him and that is where he would get the money that would pay for his secondary School fees. He joined the "Waka Waka" band that used to play at the Sheraton Hotel. He also joined other bands like "Light Rays Band" that played at Grand Imperial and "Afri-Diamonds" that became Diamond Productions and consisted of the members of the Eagle’s Productions.

In early 2002, he traveled to the United Kingdom to study sound engineering. He recorded all his albums in the UK. “Sinza” was featured on "BBC focus on Africa" and opened doors for him in different countries. “Tumusinza” was the biggest hit on the album because its sound appealed to many different countries. He later recorded “Coming Home”. It earned him invitations to perform in Geneva, USA and South Africa.

In April 2016 Katumwa released "This is Me," his tenth album after an extended period of not releasing music. During this period he spent time perfecting the album between hosting "Jazz With Isaiah," his jazz TV program on Urban TV in Uganda, as well as hosting programming on the Ugandan radio station 106.1 Jazz FM.

In 2020 Katumwa organized a virtual concert for Uganda's Independence Day, performing the song "Munu Uganda." Later in 2021 Katumwa released the album "Dance Again." Katumwa states that the album was inspired by the pandemic and his desire to return to the stage again and perform for live audiences, saying, "I missed being on stage with my audience dancing…and the question was, will we ever be able to Dance Again? This album is the answer to that question."

On May 10 of 2025 Katumwa participated in the inaugural Jazz in the Pearl Festival alongside Ugandan based musicians such as Kirk Whalum and Tshaka Mayanja. This was Isaiah's first concert in Uganda after relocating to America. Later on July 20 of 2025 Katumwa held Isaiah Katumwa @30, a concert celebrating his 30th year as a Jazz Musician. The concert featured performances by musicians that accredit Katumwa as their mentor, including Michael Ouma, Happy Kyazze, Robert Aduba, Charmant Mushaga, Joseph Sax, Michael Kitanda, Mark Langa, Jonathan Kinobe, and Tshanka Myanja.

== Discography ==
=== Albums ===
- Will worship you, 2001
- Saxo hymns, 2002
- We three kings, 2003
- Sax worship, 2004
- Celebrate Africa, 2005
- Sinza, 2006
- Coming Home, 2007
- African Smoothie, 2011
- This is Me, 2016
- Dance Again, 2021

=== Extended Plays ===
- My Joy, 2021

=== Singles ===
- Home Away, 2019
- Smile On, 2020
- Nsiima, 2021
- Dance Again, 2021
