= Bosmic Otim =

Ugandan musician and politician

William Lucky Bosmic Otim
- Born: William Otim; Kitgum,
- Genre: Acholi Music
- Occupations: Politician National Resistance Movement, and musician

William Otim also known as Bosmic Otim or Lucky Bosmic Otim is a Ugandan musician and politician, was born in Kitgum District in Northern Uganda and raised in Gulu. He lost both of his parents during the civil unrest that affected Northern Uganda in the 1980s. Following their death, he was raised by a bishop in Kitgum.

== Personal life ==
Bosmic Otim is married and has children.

He became a peace maker through his music in 2006, when National Resistance Movement was fighting with Lord's Resistance Army. In 2007, he was called by LRA to entertain them and the community. He won the 2007 Pearl of Africa Music Awards.

== Education ==
In 2019, he sat for his Uganda Advanced Certificate of Education exams which he failed, and hindered his political contesting ambition in 2021 elections. He was a People Power coordinator and chairperson, but later crossed to NRM after meeting with President Yoweri Museveni. He was also banned from performing in Uganda at a time he was in People Power, for his ill talk against government. Bosmic was under pressure and fire from the Acholi chiefdom for discrediting them on over land matters. He was also among the artists that attended the 2020 NRM party delegates Conference at Namboole stadium.

== See also ==
- Music of Uganda
- Politics of Uganda
- Northern Uganda conflict
