= Phina Mugerwa =

Uganda musician (born 1984)

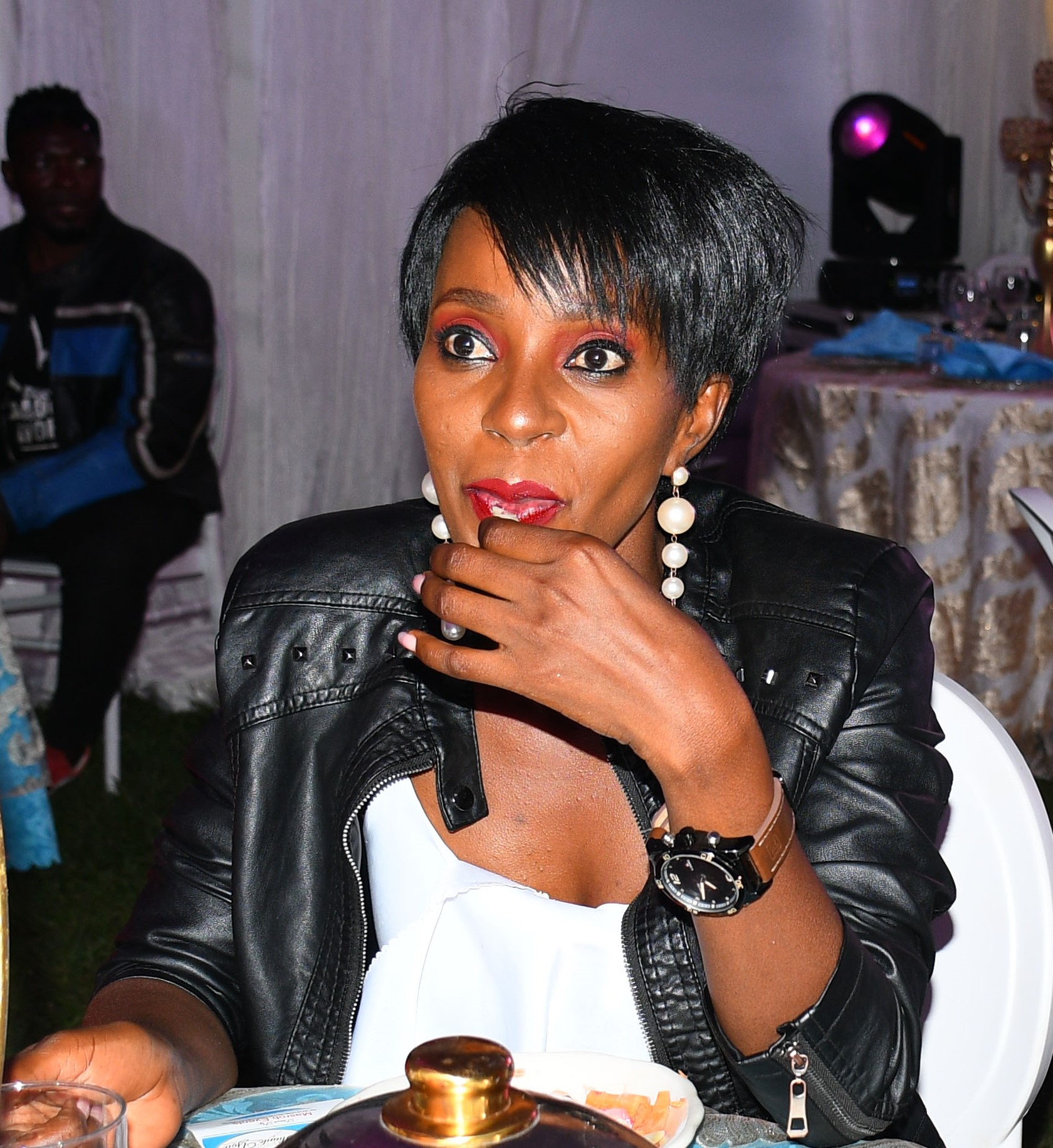
- Born: Josephine Mugerwa; 1984 (age 40–41); Kawaala, Kampala
- Education: Springfield College
- Occupation: Musician
- Children: 1
- Awards: PAM Award for Best New Artist, 2006

Josephine Mugerwa (at times called Phina Mugerwa and commonly known as Phina Masanyalaze), is a Ugandan singer and dancer who is also hailed as "Uganda's Shakira"

== Early life and education ==
Phina Mugerwa was born the fourth of the five children to Francis Kiwanuka and Annet Komugisha in 1984 in Kawaala, neighbourhood of Kampala. She attended Namirembe Kindergarten and Namirembe Infants Primary School for primary education before joining St Andrew's Kaggwa and Daniel Secondary School and Springfield College for her O Levels (UCE) and A levels (UACE) respectively

== Music ==
Mugerwa started her music career in 2007 after completing her senior six. Radio presenter Kato Lubwama had announced on the radio that he was seeking dancers to join his Diamonds Ensemble Band. She auditioned with about 300 others and was among the three that were chosen. She is famous for her dancing and her singing. Her songs like Bampassudde and Gyobera have made her a household name in Uganda's music industry.

== Discography ==
=== Songs ===
- Kwepikira
- Gyogenda
- Tinkula
- Lwaaki Ondaza
- Nze wuuyo
- Omuferere
- Bampassudde

== Awards ==
- PAM Award for Best New Artist, 2006

== Personal life ==
She has a son.
