= Kato Lubwama =

Ugandan Actor and Politician

Kato Lubwama Paul
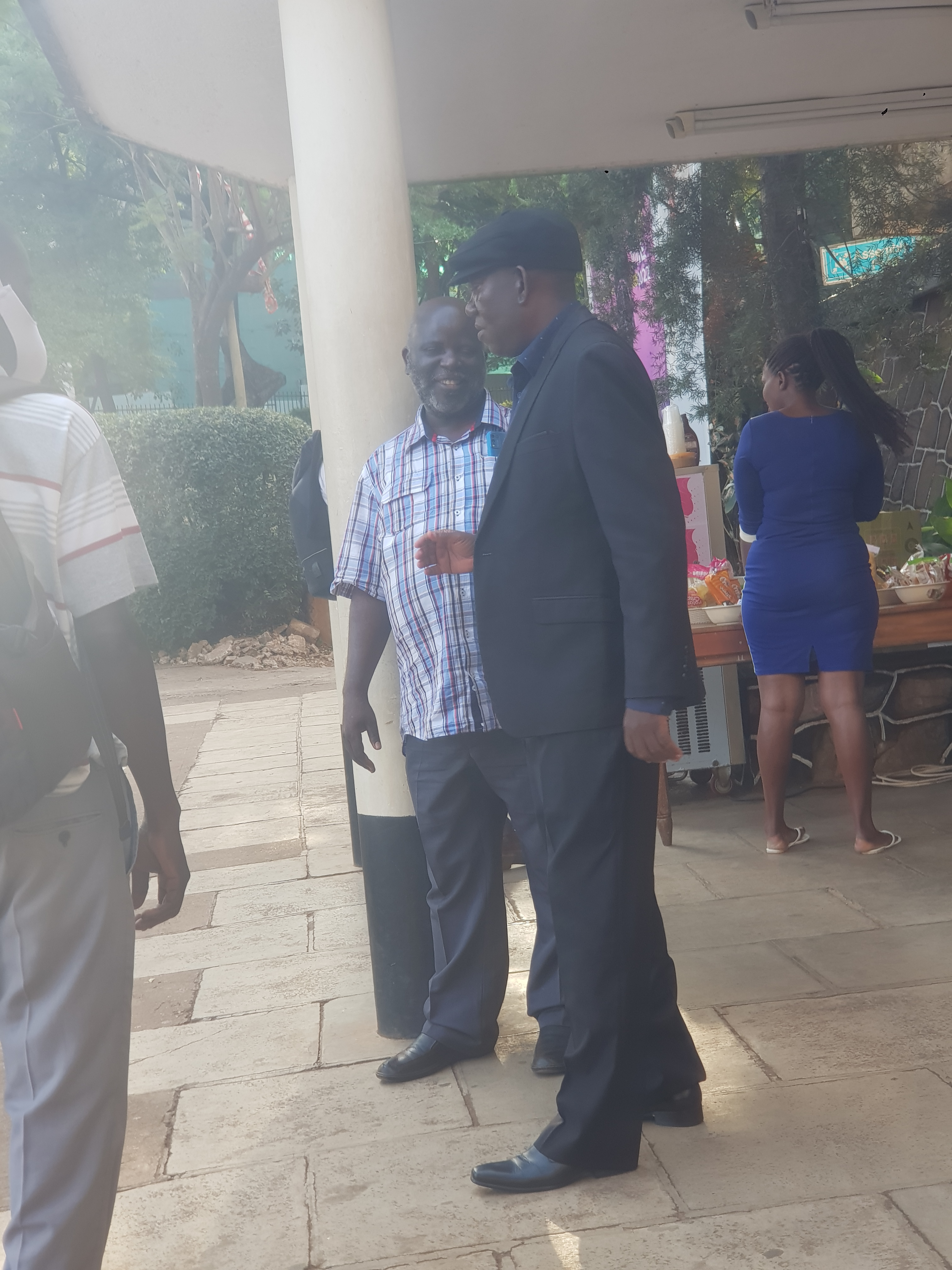
- Kato Lubwama talking to Dr.Micheal Muhumuza at national theatre in Kampala 2022
- Born: 16 August 1970; Uganda
- Died: 7 June 2023 (aged 52); Mutundwe, Kampala, Uganda
- Occupations: Filmmaker, theatre actor, musician, radio host, comedian, politician
- Years active: 1980s–2023
- Known for: Member of Parliament for Lubaga South (2016–2021); Theatre and film performances; Radio hosting
- Notable work: Abantu Bazibu* (album), *Akandolindoli* (comedy show)

EditKato Lubwama Paul (16 August 1970 – 7 June 2023) was a Ugandan film maker, theatre actor in plays including central roles in Bakayimbira Drama actors, musician, radio host and politician who served as a member of parliament for Lubaga South from 2016 to 2021.

== Entertainment career ==
Kato started out as a stage actor in theaters in Kampala in the 1980s; he became a film writer, comedian and playwright at the National Theatre in Kampala. He also wrote TV plays, and was the co-host of a morning radio show with Abby Mukiibi Nkaaga on the Buganda Kingdom owned CBS fm called Kalisoliso.

He recorded and released songs like Bank Yebyama, Dimitinya and Ekisolo on his album titled Abantu Bazibu. These songs gained airplay on local radio stations in Uganda.

He was a comedian on the weekly comedy show at Bat Valley Theatre in Kampala named Akandolindoli.

== Political career ==
In 2016, Lubwama successfully ran for the position of Member of Parliament representing the Lubaga South constituency in Kampala. In Uganda during that time, there was a debate about Yoweri Museven's intent to remove the constitutional close that could stop him from running for presidency after he has attained 75 years of age in 2021. This launched the Togikwatako campaign that aimed to stop this constitutional amendment, Kato as a member of parliament was among the people that opposed the amendment, along with Bobi Wine.

== Death ==
Lubwama died on 7 June 2023 at his home in Mutundwe, a Ugandan suburb in Kampala. It was reported that he died of a heart attack after he had been through a number of medical procedures and operation in the past for similar health complications.
