= Nince Henry =

Ugandan songwriter

Ninsiima Henry
- Born: 1988 or 1989 (age 37–38); Uganda
- Occupations: Musician & song writer
- Years active: 2009–present
- Known for: Music and song writing

Ninsiima "Nince" Henry (born 1988 or 1989) is considered Ugandan’s number one song writer since 2010 and a musician. He rose to prominence in Ugandas' music industry after writing successful songs to all Uganda’s big musicians in Uganda like Bebe Cool, Juliana Kanyomozi, Iryn Namubiru, Bobi Wine, and others. As a singer Nince Henry has made so many top hit singles like Cinderella, Mali yangu, mpola mpola and others. He balances making music for other artistes and for himself as an artiste. In 2012, Nince had some song writing projects with juliana, following the writing of the song "Sikyakaaba" which juliana was supposed to release-however there were some unknown disagreements between the two parties (Nince and juliana) and the two musicians produced the same song with the same title and lyrics, this caused confusion over who owned the song, which aroused mistrust between the two musicians. In 2013 Nince staged his first concert "MPOLA MPOLA CONCERT"

Nince begun his music career as a song writer. but after making some good songs to other musicians, he also started making some music recordings and in 2011 he released a song, cinderella which gave him a breakthrough to the music industry of Uganda.

== Discography ==
- Cinderella
- Mpola mpola
- Sikyakaaba
- Kabiriti
- Kaberebere
- Taata womuntu
- Basusi bamenvu
- Mali Yangu
- Tobalabula
- Dora Dora
- Time
- Killer Portion
- Body
- Abalungi Bawedeyo
- Madina
- Genda Genda
- Nfukilira
- Ofunda Nechupa
- Emberenge
- Ready
- Money not water
- Entandikwa
- Tobawako
- Agenda jali
- Mama nomwana
- Kampala
- Kuti kuti
- Nyonhgeza

== Music awards ==
Pam Awards - Best songwriter 2011,2012,2013 & 2014

- 2014 Zinna Best Lyrics writer
