= Stecia Mayanja =

Ugandan actress and musician

- Born: Stecia Mayanja; Uganda
- Other names: Faridah
- Citizenship: Uganda
- Occupation: Actress Musician
- Known for: Musician
- Notable work: The Honourables Stecia and the House Girl
- Awards: 2017 Prestigious HiPipo Music Awards 2016 5th Prestigious HiPipo Music Awards 2016 Uganda Entertainment Awards

Stecia Mayanja, is a Ugandan actress, and musician, who was attached to the Golden Band. Mayanja sings in Luganda and English. She was in Eagles Production Band before it became Golden Band, later on she parted ways with the Golden Band. She is also known as Faridah.

== Career ==
She has songs like Equalizer, Alintwala, Game Over, and Kawompo, she is pursuing a solo music career. Mayanja is also an actress who featured in The Honourables (2017) and performs in the webseries Stecia and the House Girl.

== Personal life ==
Mayanja was legally married to Abbas Mubiru, who works in Dubai. However, she was later in intimate relationship with her new manager at Golden band called Bashir Bogere. Unfortunately, she got issues with the band directors who showed less interest to her works for some good time.

== Discography ==
=== Album ===
- Kantinti (1930, EP)
- Mulamuzi (2015)
- Wafuka Mulamuzi (2015)
- Figure (2016)
- Alintwala (2022)

=== Singles ===
1. Kantinti

2. Equalizer

3. Kawompo

4. Ssilinda bide

5. Mwami wange

6. Sisuubila

7. Kabalagala

8. Ekilango

9. Mutima

10. Tuli Mumpaka

11. Kantinti Uganda music Dj Din

12. Tulimumpaka

13. Sirinda Bide New Ugandan music 2011 Dj Din

14. Tulimumpaka New

15. Sirinda Bide

16. TULATUTESE

17. Sisubira 18. Wafuuka Mulamuzi

19. Ekirango

== Awards ==
=== Nominated ===
- 2016 Uganda Entertainment Awards - Best Female Artist.
- 2016 5th Prestigious HiPipo Music Awards - Best Female Artist.
- 2017 Prestigious HiPipo Music Awards - Best Female Artist.

== See also ==
- Music of Uganda
- List of Ugandan musicians
