= Goodlyfe Crew =

Ugandan music group

Radio & Weasel Goodlyfe Crew
- Origin: Uganda
- Genres: Afro Beat; Pop
- Occupation: Musicians
- Years active: 2008–present
- Label: Goodlyfe Magic
- Members: Weasel Manizo
- Past members: Mowzey Radio
- Website: https://youtube.com/c/RADI%C3%92%C3%A0ndWEASELGoodlyfe

Radio & Weasel was a Ugandan music Duo that performed under their music record label "Goodlyfe Crew", with its main performers the late Moses Radio (born Moses Nakintije Ssekibogo) and Weasel Manizo (born Douglas Mayanja). Moses Radio provided smooth RnB vocals while Weasel's contribution is a fusion of reggae, ragga and dancehall vibes. Because of their prominence, Moses Radio and Weasel formed their own duo known as Radio and Weasel. The Lead singer Moses and Vocalist Radio died on 1 February 2018 from brain injuries after an assault by a bouncer at a club in Entebbe. Radio's attacker threw him down about 3 metres (9.8 ft) onto a concrete pavement which resulted in massive intracranial hemorrhage. Radio and Weasel also formed The Goodlyfe Crew. The crew saw many changes in its setup but at various times included Chagga, Lenin Briton, and Lawrence (Goodlyfe Crew). Many of its members had their own solo projects and collaborations.

== Radio and Weasel ==
Moses Radio (birth name Moses Nakintije Ssekibogo) had a prosperous musical career. He studied his ordinary level from 1998 to 2001 at Holy Cross Lake View Secondary School in Jinja, where he served as president of the school's Youth Alive Club. He composed musical projects for the club that succeeded in inter-school Youth Alive Club competitions. In 2002, Radio studied at Kiira College Butiki in Jinja where he had a two-year break in his musical career concentrating on his studies. He later joined Jose Chameleone's Leone Island Crew in 2004. While working as Jose Chameleone's backing vocalist, Radio released solos on Leone Island Records. These include "Jennifer", "Dagala", "Wololo" and "Sweet Lady".

Weasel (born Douglas Mayanja) started as an independent artist who released solo projects under the auspices of his elder brother's records, but it was his collaboration with Jose Chameleone on "Bomboclat".

Radio and Weasel became backing vocalists for the Ugandan musician Jose Chameleone but later broke off from Chameleone's Leone Island Crew in 2008 to form the Goodlyfe Crew.

The duo Radio and Weasel songs have been successful on Ugandan radio. Starting with "Nakudata" in 2008, the duo released "Lwaki Onumya", "Zuena", "Nyambura" and "Bread and Butter". In mid-2008, the duo collaborated with artists such as Rachel Kay, Blu*3, OS Suuna, Allan Toniks, GNL Zambia's General Ozzy. They performed live and collaborated with Ugandan artist Keko. of recently, they new African faces further with the likes of PJ Powers, with their song dubbed Home to Africa, with Jamaican superstar on their jam Fire & Butter. They collaborated with the Warner Music Group twin brothers Locnville in their single Done.

== Goodlyfe Crew members ==
Radio And Weasel were also the lead performers of Goodlyfe Crew. The membership of the band fluctuated, but the main members of Goodlyfe Crew were:

- Weasel Manizo
- Chagga Geoffrey
- Emotions Felingz

All members released solo projects. Jeff Kiwanuka was replaced by Chaggaman as manager following Kiwanuka's expulsion in late 2014.

== Former members ==
- Moses Radio as one of the CEO of the group. Died after sustaining injuries from a brawl in 2018.leaving Weasel Manizo as the only director and the [ [CEO] ]
- Gift of Kado - a full-time member of the crew after joining in 2009. However, in November 2010, he left and formed Kaddo Pharm with Mr X (who died in June 2012).
- Diamond Oscar
- Liam Voice

Goodlyfe Crew have their own production house, Goodlyfe Magic. However, the Goodlyfe crew have several other projects, especially in music production: they have done songs under other producers such as Washington, Bleas, Swangz Avenue, Bushington and label Nash Wonder of Monster.

== Controversies and collaborations ==
In 2008, Radio and Weasel produced "Potential" with Zambian General Ozzy. The Ugandan duo did "Take my Heart Still" with Ozzy.

In 2009, Goodlyfe Crew had a hit that they recorded alongside Rabadaba, "Opportunity or Ability". However, it was claimed that the song induced violence against Bebe Cool, especially on Radio's part. In early 2014, Radio and Weasel collaborated Pallaso and Mess, in the song "Amaaso". In 2011, they produced "Dembesa" with Da TWINZ. Radio and Weasel released another collaboration with Diamond Oscar in the song "You Make Me cry". Radio and Weasel have recorded with other Ugandan artists: "Tax Money" with Sizza Man, "Pollination", with Obsession in 2011.

In 2010, Radio and Weasel recorded "Maama Wabaana" with Tom Close. and in 2013, they recorded with Desire Luzinda, and "Hellena" with David Lutalo.

In March 2011 a new dispute arose in Kampala between Radio/Weasel and Kenzo. This dispute stemmed from Kenzo's song "Mundeke Numbe". The Goodlyfe Crew claimed that the whole concept of the song and video was copied from their song "Talk and Talk".

In December 2013, Radio and Weasel fought a famous musical battle with Bebe Cool. Dubbed "The Battle of the Champions", it was held at Kyadondo Rugby grounds. Chameleone praised the Goodlyfe Crew for their performance; he also praised Bebe Cool. No clear decision emerged. This also led into resolving of their dispute with their former Leone Island boss Chameleone and Radio and Weasel teamed up again with Chameleone for the first time since their breakup in 2008. This prompted the duo to share the stage with Chameleone in the Tubonge concert of 2014.

In 2013 the two claimed to have ended their dispute with Gagamel singer Bebe Cool as well.

== Awards ==
=== Won ===
- 2015 HiPipo Music Awards - Best Duo Group Artist Radio And Weasel
- 2015 HiPipo Music Awards - Song Of The Year Neera – Radio And Weasel
- 2015 HiPipo Music Awards - Album Of The Year Amaaso Ntunga By Radio And Weasel
- 2015 HiPipo Music Awards - Best Rnb Song Neera – Radio And Weasel
- 2014 HiPipo Music Awards – Best Duo-Group Artist (' Radio and Weasel')
- 2014 HiPipo Music Awards – Album of the Year – Radio and Weasel ('Obudde Album')
- 2008 Pearl of Africa Music Awards – Song of the year ('Nakudata')
- 2008 Pearl of Africa Music Awards – Best AfroBeat Single ('Zuena')
- 2008 Pearl of Africa Music Awards – Best New Artiste

Tanzania Music Awards

- 2010: Best East African Song – Bread and Butter/ Where You Are ft. BLU*3
- 2011: Best East African Song – Heart Attack Vuvuzela
- Channel O Music Video Awards
- 2011: Most Gifted African East Video – This is How We Do It ft. Keko

Buzz Teeniez Awards Uganda

- 2010: Hottest Group/Duo
- 2011: Hottest Group/Duo
- 2011: Hottest Collabo – Mr. DJ ft. Swangz Avenue

=== Nominated ===
- 2010 Tanzania music awards – Best East African Song ('Bread and Butter') & ('Where you are' with Blu*3)
- MTV Africa Music Awards 2010 - Best Group
- 2011 Tanzania Music Awards – Best East African Song ('Vuvuzela')

In August 2011, Goodlyfe's Radio and Weasle were nominated in Africa music awards, MOAMA for the group of the year. The Goodlyfe's song Vuvuzela(2010 hit) was in the nominations in the dance hall category.

- 2013 BET Music Awards – Best International Act Africa.
- MTV Africa Music Awards 2014 – Best Collaboration ("Kiboko Changu" – Amani featuring Radio and Weasel)

Radio and Weasel Music albums Goodlyfe have about ten music albums 1. Mwana Wabandi (2016) 2. Neera & The Best of Radio & weasel (2015) 3. Amaaso Ntunga Album ( 2014 ) 4. Obudde (2014) 5. Fantastic (2014) 6. Tonjagala (2012) 7. Talk and Tailk (2011) 8. Ngenda Maaso (2010) 9. Bread and Butter (2009) 10. Nyambura (2008)

== Discography ==
(includes Goodlyfe Crew/Radio and Weasel releases)

- 2008: Nyambura
- 2009: Bread and Butter
- 2010: Ngenda Maaso
- 2011: Talk and Talk
- 2012: Tonjagala
- 2014: Fantastic
- 2014: Obudde
- 2014: Amaaso Ntunga
- 2015: Neera & The Best of Radio & Weasel
- 2015: Nkwegomba
- 2016: Mwana Wabandi
- 2016: Hallo
- 2016: Plenty Plenty
- 2016: Media Appreciation
- 2016: Tovawo Awo
- 2016: Jaburata (Remix)
- 2016: Nfuula Zaabu
- 2016: Nkya Kujukila
- 2016: Sumulula
- 2016: Engule
- 2016: One In A Million
- 2016: Gudi Gude
- 2017: Skin Tight (Remix)
- 2017: Panadol
- 2017: Ntwalako Out
