= Jose Chameleone =

Ugandan musician (born 1979)

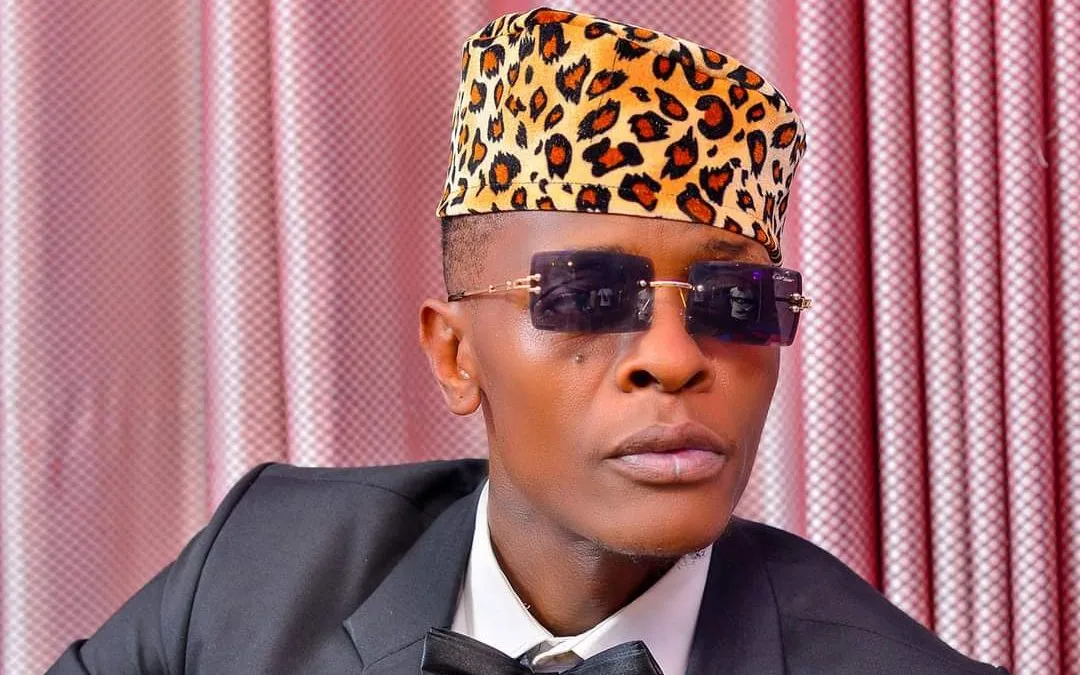

Background information
- Born: Joseph Mayanja; 30 April 1979 (age 47); Kampala, Uganda
- Genres: African rumba; R&B; Afro pop; hip-hop; dancehall; zouk; Afrobeats
- Occupations: Singer; songwriter; record producer
- Years active: 1990s–present
- Label: Leone Island Music Empire
- Spouse: Daniella Atim (m. 2008; div. 2017)
- Relatives: Pallaso (brother); Akay 47 (brother); Weasel (brother)

Joseph Mayanja (born 30 April 1979), commonly known by his stage name "Jose Chameleone", is a Ugandan AfroBeat artist and musician. He sings in Luganda, English, and Swahili.

== Early life and education ==
Joseph Mayanja was born on 30 April 1979 to Gerald and Prossy Mayanja in Kampala district, as the fourth of eight children.

He went to Nakasero Primary School, Mengo Senior Secondary School, Kawempe Muslim Senior Secondary School where he composed the School Anthem that’s been used until today, Katikamu Seventh Day Adventist Senior Secondary School, and Progressive Senior Secondary School.

He composed the Kawempe Muslim Secondary School anthem. He is a member of the Roman Catholic Church of Uganda.

== Musical career ==
Chameleone's music style is a mixture of Ugandan folk, central African rhumba, zouk, and reggae.

His career began in 1996 as a DJ at the Missouri night club in Kampala. He became active as a musician in 1998 in Kenya with the Ogopa Deejays, then a Kenyan record label, which released his first single, "Bageya", featuring Kenyan artist Redsan.

Chameleone released his first album, Mama Mia, in 2000. By 2013, he had released a total of 13 albums, including Kipepeo, Shida za dunia, Valu valu, Bayuda, Badilisha, Sweet Banana and Champion. Some of his hit songs include "Valu valu", "Jamila", "Shida za dunia", Bayuda, "Tatizo", "Nkwagala nyo", "Kipepeo", "Dorotia" and "Kipepeo".

Although his music is popular all over the African continent, the majority of his fans/listeners are mainly from the central part of Africa (Democratic Republic of the Congo, Rwanda, Burundi, Kenya, Ethiopia, Malawi, Zambia, Sudan, Uganda, and Tanzania).

He performed to the largest audience at the Lugogo Cricket Oval Stadium in Kampala.

Chameleone has performed internationally, including in the United States, Canada, United Kingdom, Sweden, Belgium, Malaysia, China, South Africa, the Democratic Republic of the Congo,Zimbabwe, Ethiopia, Sierra Leone, United Arab Emirates, Oman,Zambia, Malawi, South Sudan, Germany, and Switzerland.

2010: Jose Chameleone took Ugandan music to the world stage—collaborating with Kelly Rowland, 2Face Idibia and Samini on “Everywhere You Go”, then performing at the FIFA World Cup closing ceremony before a global audience of over 500 million. A historic moment. A global legacy.

He toured Australia in 2017 and in March 2023.

In February 2023, Chameleone held a successful concert titled "Gwanga Mujje", which translates to "let the whole nation attend". The event took place at Lugogo Cricket Oval in Kampala. Originally planned for an earlier date, the concert was postponed due to heavy rain and rescheduled for 24 February 2023.

Chameleone organised a sold-out charity event called "One Man, One Million" at Victoria Hall in Kampala. The event was endorsed by the first lady of Uganda, Janet Museveni, and attendees were required to pay one million Ugandan Shillings to attend.

=== Music label ===
Chameleone is the CEO of the music label Leone Island Music Empire. Artists associated with this label have included the late Mosey Radio, Weasel, the late AK 47 Mayanja, King Saha, Papa Cidy, Pallaso, Melody Uganda, Yung Mulo and Big Eye.

== Other activities ==
The former speaker of the parliament of Uganda, Rebecca Kadaga, designated Chameleone the Ambassador of the Busoga Tourism Initiative.

He also directs Chameleone Foundation, which is aimed at improving skills and talent amongst disadvantaged youth.

Chameleone is a member of a coalition of musicians who use their fame and fortune to help reduce poverty and create awareness campaigns for HIV/AIDS.

He ran for office as Lord Mayor of Kampala in 2021.

== Awards ==
=== Won ===
• 2003 Pearl of Africa Music Awards (4PAM Awards) -Artist of the Year -Best Male Artist - Best Contemporary Artist and Song of the Year (Mama Mia)

- 2004 Pearl of Africa Music Awards (2PAM Awards) – Artiste of the Year & Song of the Year ("Jamila")
- 2005 Pearl of Africa Music Awards (PAM Awards) – Best Afro Beat Artiste/Group & Best Afro Beat Single ("Kipepeo")
- 2004 Tanzania Music Awards – Best East African Album (Bei Kali)
- 2005 Tanzania Music Awards – Best East African Album (Jamila)
- 2006 Pearl of Africa Music Awards (PAM Awards) – Best Afro Beat Artiste/Group
- 2006 Kisima Music Awards – Best Ugandan Song ("Mama Rhoda") & Best Ugandan Music Video ("Mama Rhoda")
- 2007 Kisima Music Awards – Best Ugandan Song ("Sivyo Ndiviyo" with Professor Jay)
- 2010 Pearl of Africa Music Awards - Best Afrobeat Artist & Best Afrobeat Single (Basiima Ogenze)
- 2011 Pearl of Africa Music Awards - Best Afrobeat Artist
- 2013 African Entertainment Awards – International Best Male Artist
- 2013 BEFFTA Awards - Best International Act
- 2014 Hipipo Music Awards - Song of the Year (Badilisha)
- 2014 HiPipo Music Awards – Best Male ZOUK Song ("Badilisha")
- 2015 All Africa Music Awards (AFRIMA) – Song Writer of the Year in AFRICA
- 2018 Galaxy Zzina Music Awards – Legend Award
- 2018 Urithi Festival Recognition (Tanzania) - Honored for promoting the Swahili language through Music
- 2019 African Decent Society - Lifetime Achievement Award & Best African Inspiration in African Music Industry
- 2026 Bongo Flava Honors Recognition- Honored for his contributions to the Kiswahili Music

=== Nominated ===
- 2003 Kora Awards – Best East Africa Artist
- 2004 Kora Awards – Best East African Male Artist
- 2006 MOBO Awards – Best African Act
- 2007 MTV Europe Music Awards – Best African Act
- 2012 Tanzania Music Awards – Best East African Song ("Valu Valu")
- 2014 World Music Awards (three categories) – World Best Male Artist, World Best Live Act & World Best Performer
- 2015 MTV Africa Music Awards – MAMA Evolution Award

== Discography ==
=== Albums ===
Year	Album	Record label
2000	Bageya	Ogopa Deejays
2001	Mama Mia	Ogopa Deejays
2002	Njo Karibu	Ogopa Deejays
2003	The Golden Voice	Ogopa Deejays
2004	Mambo Bado	Ogopa Deejays
2005	Kipepeo	
2006	Shida za Dunia	
2007	Sivyo Ndivyo	
2007	Katupakase	
2009	Bayuda	
2010	Vumilia	
2012	Valu Valu	
2013	Badilisha	
2014	Wale Wale	
2016	Sili Mujawo	
2017	Sweet Banana, Superstar, Mshamba	
2018	Champion, Mateeka, Kilabe Tatizo	
2020	Baliwa, Bolingo ya Nzambe	
2021	I am Joseph - Coming Soon	

== See also ==
- Bobi wine
- Bebe cool
