= Music of Uganda =

The music of Uganda is broad and diverse, ranging from traditional indigenous music to Ugandan versions of many contemporary genres.

In Africa, Uganda is now ranked third when it comes to music, comedy, nightlife and entertainment at large. Ugandan musicians have embraced digital music platforms such as Spotify, iTunes and DJ Erycom - a local music promotion platform. Uganda is home to over 65 different ethnic groups and tribes, and they form the basis of all indigenous music.

The first form of popular music to arise out of traditional music was the Kadongo Kamu style of music, which arose out of traditional Kiganda music. From the 1980s to early '90s, Kadongo Kamu was influenced by musicians such as Peterson Mutebi, Dan Mugula, Sebadduka Toffa, Fred Ssonko, Livingstone Kasozi, Fred Masagazi, Baligidde, Abuman Mukungu, Gerald Mukasa, Sauda Nakakaawa, Matia Luyima, Herman Basudde, and Paulo Kafeero. Music genres drew from Kadongo Kamu, making it the most influential style of music in Uganda. In the late '80s, the late Philly Lutaaya released his Born In Africa album that would later dominate the airwaves. Lutaaya also released Merry Christmas that consisted of eight songs. This album is still popular and many of Philly Lutaaya's songs are now anthems amongst Ugandan music lovers.

In the early 1990s, a new music genre – afro ragga, locally called Kidandali – was formed by Rasta Rob, Kid Fox, Ras Khan, Messe, Shanks Vivid, Menton Summer, Ragga Dee, Bebe Cool, Jose Chameleone, Bobi Wine and Steve Jean - who would later produce their songs. In 1997, Emperor Orlandoh and Menton Summer were the darlings after their song "Sirikawo Baby" becoming a national hit.

In 1998, Red Banton rose to fame with his album Noonya Money. He became the first Ugandan artist to travel to the United Kingdom on an Artist Visa.

Because of the effects of globalization, Uganda, like most African countries, has seen a growth in modern audio production. This has led to the adoption of western music styles such as Afrobeat,R&B, Dancehall and Hip Hop.

Uganda's most travelled and popular DJ, Erycom, real names Mutebi Erycom, was the first Ugandan to own a Youtube channel and is one of the first two Ugandans to make Ugandan music circulate online digitally.

DJ Erycom has used the availability of the internet to promote Ugandan music and Ugandan artists, hence the reason as to why Ugandan music has reached every corner of this digital world.

A number of performing artists have joined the Uganda Performing Right Society which has furthermore improved Uganda artists music and benefits through its role as copyright administrator.

== Traditional music from different regions of Uganda ==
Uganda is divided into four regions – Central, Northern, Eastern and Western. Each region has distinct traditional music as per the tribes and ethnicities.

Uganda's nationalities are diverse and spread evenly throughout the country. Native music in Uganda, as in most African regions, is mainly functional. This means that most music and music activities usually have specific functions related to specific events such as marriage, initiation, royal festivals, harvests and war among others. The music is performed by skilled tribesmen and women performing folk songs and traditional dances with various traditional instruments.

=== Central ===
The Baganda are found in Buganda in the central region; they are the largest native nationality in the country. The kingdom is ruled by a king, known as a Kabaka. The kabaka has traditionally been the main patron of the music of Buganda. Musical instruments include various forms of drums, making percussion an integral part of the music).

The massive and sacred royal drums are just one of the many drum types. The engalabi is another common drum and it is a long round shaped drum. The drums are used in unison with various other melodic musical instruments ranging from chordophones such as the ennanga harp and the entongoli lyre, lamellophones, aerophones, idiophones and the locally made fiddle called kadingidi.

Music is played for dancing in the community. The call and response style of singing is common with the Bantu from the 19th century. The Baganda have a variety of vibrant dances that go along with the elaborate instrumentation. The bakisimba dance is the most common and most performed; others include the nankasa and the amaggunju. The amaggunju is an exclusive dance developed in the palace for the Kabaka.

Northern Uganda in particularly Acholi had a powerful Vocalist name Ojara Eddy in the late '80s.

=== Eastern ===
To differentiate Eastern region from other regions. This region has several tribes, namely Bagwere, Basoga, Banyoli, Bagisu, Jopadhola, Iteso, Sabin, and Basamya. Each tribe has its own kind of music. In the '90s, these tribes produced music using their own made instruments. For example, the Bagwere had an instrument called kongo, basoga had xylophones (mbeire), Jopadhola and Banyoli had fumbo, and Iteso had adungu. During that time their music was different in production and composition according to which tribe was singing. In the 20th century, many tribes have tried to adopt to modern production while still making their songs in their tribe’s native language. There are many artists from several tribes. Bagwere has Waisana, Benenego, rapper Sky Dee, Area B, Waikere, Bluzman etc. Bagisu has San Sea, Ben, Nutty Neithan etc, and Basoga has Crazy MC, Racheal Magola, Maro etc. Most of these tribes have kings that have helped in the promotion of culture and music at large. The Bagwere king is called Ikumbania, the Bagisu king is called Omukuka, the Basoga king is called Chabazinga, and the Iteso king is called Emorimori. Lastly, the Eastern region has several districts.

=== Western ===
Musician from the era Sister Charity, Chance Kahindo and Rasta Charz to the years of Ray G, Jolow, Allan Toniks, Seyo, T Bro, Emily Kikazi, Muzz Joe, T Paul, Rachael T, Mat Henry, CJ Champion to Penny Patra, Amani Amaniga, Carol Kay, Prettie Immaq and other newer artists.

After the success of a one "Omusheshe" song of Ray G & Spice Diana, Runyankole was embraced in major parts of Uganda. Central artists too teaming up with western Uganda's artists on songs like "True man hood" Allstars ft T Bro, "Tikikushemerire" of Gen Geeon ft Jose Chameleon, "Yeele" Geosteady ft Ray G, "Ninkukunda" Ray G ft Voltage music, "Mbarara boy" Mc Kacheche ft John Blaq, "Elevate" Rachael T ft Colifixe, "Sagala" T Paul ft Cosign. These too have boosted the industry to the national level.

Television and radio stations such as 97.7 FM Record radio are also supporting talent. The development of radio from the region's first broadcaster "Voice of Tooro" to Radio West, Messiah Radio in Kasese, Voice of Kigezi to Endigyito, Voice of Kamwenge, Kasese Guide Radio, Rwenzori FM, BFM, Hits FM, and urban radios like Crooze FM, Boona FM, K Town Radio, Ngabu FM and Street Deejays Radio (Online Radio) has seen western Uganda's music grow quickly.

Television development has been slow, though the establishment of TV West and Bunyoro TV has also developed western Uganda's music. The two networks have given platforms to the artists through broadcasting their videos and bringing them to the public eye. Through radio and television MC Kacheche, Kunana MC, Lithan MC and Mr Jay became well known. Kacheche's coming is one of the reasons Western Uganda's music has been embraced in the central region. The growth in music events, especially in bars of Mbarara, Rukungiri, Kabale, Fort Portal, Ishaka, Kasese and Kamwenge gives platforms to new artists to be heard.

== Popular music ==
Because of Uganda's turbulent political history, there was never enough time for there to be a thriving pop music industry until relative peace was restored in the late 1980s. By then, Philly Lutaaya, Afrigo Band, and Elly Wamala were among the few Ugandan acts to have had mainstream music success. Jimmy Katumba and his music group the Ebonies were also popular at this time, especially towards the 1990s.

Musicians like, Carol Nakimera, Kezia Nambi, Fred Maiso, Kads Band, Rasta Rob, Menton Summer were on top of the Ugandan music game between 1990 and 1997. Artists such as Livingstone Kasozi, Herman Basudde and Paulo Kafeero also played a great role in bringing live music near to the fans.

According to popular Ugandan music promoter DJ Erycom, in the year 1998, Uganda experienced the biggest change musically, due to musician Red Banton (the Five star general) who rose to fame with his hit song "Noonya Money" that played countrywide. Red Banton ruled the Ugandan music scene until the year 2000 when Jose Chameleone returned from Kenya with his song "Mama Mia" that turned into a National anthem in Uganda and East Africa at large.

The 1990s saw Uganda's love affair with Jamaican music begin when artists such as Shanks Vivi Dee, Ragga Dee, and others were influenced by Jamaican superstars such as Shabba Ranks. They imported the Ragga music culture into Uganda and, although they faced stiff competition from other African music styles and musicians at the time, in particular Soukous from Congo and Kwaito from South Africa, they formed the foundation of the pop music industry. But it was not until the 21st century when musicians such as Chameleone emerged that a pop music scene really began.

By around 2007, there were a number of musicians practicing varied styles of music, and the role of western and Congolese/South African music had greatly diminished. Today, Iryn Namubiru and King Saha are just two of the many pop musicians in the Ugandanan pop music scene. The pop music duo of Radio & Weasel, the Goodlyfe Crew, are well known around Africa, being nominated in the continental MTV Base awards in 2010 and BET awards in 2013. In June 2015, Eddy Kenzo won the award for "Best new international artist" at the 2015 BET music awards.

=== Kadongo Kamu ===
The word "Kadongo Kamu" is a term in the Luganda language that means "one guitar". The music is given this name because of the role played by the bass guitar, which most times is the solo instrument used in creation of the music. Perhaps the first well known artist of the genre was Fred Masagazi in the 1960s.

The late Elly Wamala contributed a lot in making urban Kadongo Kamu style. Christopher Sebadduka popularised the genre and perhaps this is why he is considered by many to be the Godfather of Kadongo Kamu. Elly Wamala abandoned this genre because it was also instrumented by non elite such as Christopher Sebadduka. His brand of educative singing won him many fans and he is one of the few musicians who was involved with Uganda's independence in 1962. They were followed by a number of musicians who kept true to the style and sound of the music.

Herman Basudde was a very popular kadongo kamu musician in the 1980s and 1990s. So was Bernard Kabanda. Dan Mugula is one of the few surviving pioneers of the genre. Fred Ssebatta and Paulo Kafeero made their mark in the 1990s. Today, the genre is marginalized in favor of more recent styles of music. But because the music is loved by cultural loyalists in the Buganda region, it is certain that there will always be an audience for kadongo kamu.

From the independence days, Kadongo Kamu faced marketing and promotion challenges. There's no single Kadongo Kamu song that ever got airplay or publicity in night clubs, urban bars and uptown places. All Kadongo Kamu artists did not get the recognition they deserved until late 2000s when deejays started giving ears to this genre.

Legendary DJ Erycom was the first deejay to promote Kadongo Kamu music in Uganda. In 2007, Erycom, who was a fresh deejay, announced that he was going to promote strictly Ugandan music, but putting more emphasis on Kadongo Kamu and band music. His decision to prioritize Ugandan music attracted the attention of then big musicians such as Dr Tee, Mathias Walukagga, Betty Mpologoma, Martin Angume (the late), Abdu Mulaasi and others. Since then, DJ Erycom was labelled the "Local but Global DJ".

=== Kidandali ===
Kidandali is a music genre that currently is arguably the most popular genre of music in Uganda. However, the term "kidandali" is not universally agreed on as the name of this genre with some local sources preferring instead to use the very simplistic term "Band Music" while others prefer the term Afrobeat, even though the music shares no similarities with Afrobeat. The roots of this genre can be traced back to the bands that sprung up after Uganda got independence in 1962.

The Cranes Band, which later gave birth to Afrigo Band, can be regarded as the first group in the evolution process of this genre. At the very outset, their music was heavily influenced by Soukous and Congolese artists Franco were notable influences at the time. Jazz was also a notable influence. Along the way there were other bands like Rwenzori Band, Big Five Band and Simba Ngoma Band. But Afrigo Band was the most prominent and most enduring, especially throughout the political unrest of the 1970s to 1990s.

By the mid 1990s Afrigo Band was still heavily influenced by Soukous music, which by then was dominant all over the African continent. Artists Joanita Kawalya and Rachael Magoola were part of Afrigo Band and helped lay the foundation for modern day Kidandali, alongside other bands such as Kaads Band. The turning point, however, came with the formation of the record label Eagles Production which was responsible for producing artists such as Mesach Semakula, Geoffrey Lutaaya, Ronald Mayinja and Haruna Mubiru. These artists took the mantle from Afrigo Band and further developed the genre after the turn of the century.

In the 2000s, the genre became identified with the Eagles Production label. The label continued to produce more talent, especially female artists Ronald Mayinja, Geoffrey Lutaaya, Mesach Semakula, Roy Kapale, Mariam Ndagire, Phionah Mukasa, Mariam Mulinde, Queen Florence, the late Harriet Kisaakye, Cathy Kusasira, Irene Namatovu and Stecia Mayanja. Another turning point was in 2008 when David Lutalo broke through with the hit song "Kapapaala", paving the way for the Urban Band genre to move beyond a genre that had for long been dominated by Eagles Production, Diamond Production, Kads Band, Backeys Band, Kats Production and The Hommies among others.

In the year 2003, Abdu Mulaasi debuted with his hit "Omusono Gwa Mungu". He went on to release a number of other hits including "Swimming Pool", "Njagal Ebbere", "Ekyaapa", "Obuffumbo Bwa Liizi", "Ngenda Kusiba Farm" and "Omuchaina". By the end of 2010, Abdu Mulaasi had changed the sound of KadongoKamu, thereby introducing Urban Kadongo Kamu.

DJ Erycom, one of Uganda's legendary Deejays was the first deejay to play, promote and popularize Kadongokamu music across bars and happening places in and outside Uganda.

About the same time, technology in audio production had enabled the genre to be reproduced digitally using Audio Workstations and the "band" element had all but disappeared. Recording studios such as Kann, Dream Studios, Mozart and Paddyman took center stage. Many other independent solo artists started to practice the genre. Artists like Dr Tee, Martin Angume and even Chameleone achieved success with this genre. The genre is currently at the peak of its evolution with newer artists such as Papa Cidy and Chris Evans helping create a dominant force that, alongside Dancehall, is the most popular stylistic genre in Uganda.

=== Dancehall ===
Dancehall music in Uganda is modeled after Jamaican Dancehall. It is among the most influential styles of music in the Ugandan pop music industry. The style of music is very similar to the Jamaican style and so like all imported genres, the only major difference is in language used. Although most dancehall artists will perform in their local language, in this case Luganda, many of them will every now and then try to mimic Jamaican patois. During the early to mid 1990s when Uganda's pop industry was just beginning to be formed, the first international music to make an impression on Ugandan artists was the Raggamuffin music in Jamaica at the time. Artists like Shabba Ranks and Buju Banton became the inspiration for Ugandan artists like Shanks Vivi D, Ragga Dee, Menton Krono and Rasta Rob. The predominant beat that was used by these artists was the Dem Bow beat which was created by Shabba Ranks. This beat became the foundation on which all of Ugandan dancehall was to be built on later, just like it did with Reggaeton. In the late 1990s new artists such as Mega Dee and Emperor Orlandoh joined the fray.

By the turn of the century, dancehall, or ragga as it was/is commonly called, was already the most popular music genre. New artists including Chameleone, Bebe Cool and Bobi Wine joined the scene and consolidated it. But they didn't create any marked improvement in the quality and sound of the music they found, as it remained pretty simplistic and heavily based on Dem Bow. From then on, the quality of music became commensurate with the quality of production available. Chameleone was the first dancehall artist to try to fuse this ragga sound with other genres such as Soukous and Kadongo Kamu. By around 2006, there were a variety of musicians practicing the genre but also without much advancement in style or sound.

By this time, Jamaican dancehall had already taken a sharp turn away from the harsh "ragga" sound based on chatting over simplistic riddims and there was a new wave of dancehall deejays such as Vybz Kartel and Busy Signal who were deejaying over more advanced riddims. Artists such as Dr Hilderman came into the scene with new words such as Double bed Mazongoto and have continued to grow. Subsequently, new Ugandan artists emerged including Rabadaba, Sizza and Fidempa create a more modern version of dancehall. Ugandan dancehall artists have achieved significant financial success within the industry, many are industrious and live luxurious lives.

=== Hip Hop/R&B ===
Hip Hop music in Uganda is modeled after American Hip Hop. There is really not much difference stylistically between Ugandan hip hop and the American version. Because of the digital revolution, there is access to modern production technologies in Uganda hence the "beats" that current local producers are creating are high quality and not far behind the American ones. The fundamental difference between the two genres is that in Uganda, as in most African countries, most artists will rap in their local language. In Uganda's case, the language is Luganda. This has created the synonym "Lugaflow" to further define Ugandan rap music.

Hip hop is one of the newer genres to be widely practiced in Uganda. The music groups Klear Kut and Bataka Squad were the first musical acts to do hip hop, in the late 1990s. Mainstream acceptance for the music genre was almost nonexistent then. However, a number of the members of the aforementioned groups persisted with the genre, especially Navio (rapper) and Babaluku. Others including Sylvester & Abramz also kept creating rap music, focusing on socially conscious themes and topics.

Around the middle of the previous decade, more acts started joining the fray, with Rocky Giant being one of the first rappers to be embraced in the mainstream, but it was not until GNL broke through circa 2008 that the genre really gained steam. GNL made hip hop more acceptable and accessible and many "lugaflow" rappers began to emerge. Since then there has been a flurry of activity on the scene with a sizable number of rappers enjoying relative success in the music industry and on the radio circuit. Musicians such as Jay-P, Lil Meek DC and keko are among a new breed of Ugandan hip hop acts appealing to a broader audience, with their music featuring on international platforms such as MTV.

As with Hip Hop, R&B in Uganda is modeled after American R&B. There is not much history in Ugandan R&B, with Steve Jean being the first artist to practice the genre around the turn of the century. But it was Michael Ross who really began the trend circa 2002 with songs including "How Do You Love" and "Sinorita". It was not until circa 2008 that a number of musicians started to embrace the style, with Myco Chris and Baby Joe among those in the Ugandan diaspora that must be credited. Blu 3 and Aziz Azion are notable practitioners. Recently, artists including Nick Nola, Richy, Pallaso, Woodz and Yoyo have spread the appeal of the genre further.

=== Gospel ===
Early Gospel music in Uganda was modeled mainly after praise and worship music practiced by church choirs and bands. This was particularly true for the pentecostal/Born Again movement, locally referred to as Balokole.

Artists such as Fiona Mukasa in the mid-1990s were responsible for taking praise and worship music out of the churches and onto the streets. Because of the influence of Soukous music at the time, this early gospel had a Soukous sound. Limit X were another gospel group that gained popularity during the 1990s, although the group had formed years earlier, in the late 1970s.

Just after the turn of the century, the styles in gospel became more diverse, with various groups such as Sauti, and First Love adding to the urban sound created by Limit X. George Okudi and Father Musaala had hits on the radio circuit and internationally.

Gospel, however, started having a notable impact on the music industry when Judith Babirye broke through circa 2007. Babirye, whose music was similar to Mukasa's, was an instant hit and her song "Beera Nange" was among the songs of the year in its year of release.

She was followed by Wilson Bugembe, another musician who was readily embraced by the listening public with his songs becoming national hits, cutting across all demographics.

They have since been joined by various new artists such as Levixone whose song "mbeera" turned into a hit song in year 2021 and others who are spanning various genres.

== Classical ==
There are a few music schools in a conservatoire model in Uganda, most of them in the capital Kampala. The music schools in Kampala include Kampala Music School, MusiConnexions Uganda and Esom Music School. "Even though they are not very well equipped as a result of small budgets, they offer appropriate music training to many people. To date more young people and adults alike appreciate classical music better and as such they engage in taking private music lessons, attending classical music concerts and several take part in actual performances. There are a few Western music education stems way back to missionary times. Before the missionaries arrived in Uganda does not mean that music education was not in existence, but rather that it was different from what was introduced by missionaries. Classical music in Uganda is developing and growing little by little.

== Music industry ==
Uganda's music industry plays a fundamental role in the social and economic lives of many. Musicians are the main celebrities in Uganda, and all entertainment content from the mainstream media will most times be about music or musicians. The private lives of musicians are closely followed by many Ugandans. Music concerts, most times called album launches, are very popular. Many companies spend large amounts of money on sponsoring these music concerts, and advertisements for the concerts are very common on radio and television.

The emphasis on music concerts comes from the fact that very few music artists make a worthwhile income from sales of their music on physical media. The lack of any distribution structure means that there is little to no incentive for capital investment in artist development or music sales. There are no genuine record labels, with most of the companies that are referred to as labels being merely artist management companies. Because of these inadequacies, there is a severe strain placed upon musicians to find profitability and sustainability in making music.

There have also been efforts at organizing the music industry, with the Uganda Performing Rights Society (UPRS), Bryan Morel Publications and Uganda Musicians Association being prime examples alongside a number of music awards organizations such as AFRIMA Awards, PAM Awards and more recently HiPipo Music Awards. Attempts by some of these organizations to make use of under-utilised and largely ignored local copyright law to generate revenue from music distribution have proved fruitless. These are some of the challenges facing the music industry in the country and indeed are very similar to the ones facing most music industries around the world.

== Promotion of Ugandan Music ==
According to Jones, A.M (1954), traditional music has remained popular with rural communities and Uganda has a plethora of distinctive instruments, which can also be heard in contemporary popular music. The most notable record labels such as Black Market Records and international organisations such as Singing Wells and Selam from the UK have been working to promote regional and traditional music in Uganda. Currently, the above organisations have been specialising in field-recording in rural areas. Their initial projects were aimed at helping the localisation of hip-hop, though they have recently been facilitating capacity building work (audio production, copyright knowledge) through the support of Swedish International Development Cooperation Agency (SIDA). Some UK labels have picked up on obscure but cool local music scenes and some of Uganda's music could fill this niche and find a route to international markets. These styles could include Larakaraka music from Gulu or Bukusu Music from the North East Mbale region. Alongside Kandongo Kamu, another native popular music is Kidandali. In their contemporary forms they are both fused with reggae and ragga.

Ugandan pop musicians have used radio and television to promote their music. Others have held concerts and others performing their music at events such as weddings and other kinds of parties. With the coming of the internet, they used social media to promote their music. These avenues also helped then earn money. However, most Ugandan musicians haven't yet embraced digital distribution of their music. The Covid-19 pandemic affected the method of music promotion and distribution and saw musicians embracing the use of the internet to promote and distribute their music.

== See also ==
- Baganda music
- Bigwala
- Kadongo Kamu
- Kidandali
- Ray G
