= Emperor Orlandoh =

Ugandan musician and radio presenter

- Born: John Ssozi; September 1974 (age 52); Bugolobi, Kampala, Uganda
- Origin: Kampala, Uganda
- Genres: Ragga, reggae, Afrobeat
- Occupations: Musician, radio presenter
- Years active: 1990s–present

Emperor Orlandoh born John Ssozi (September 1974) is a Ugandan musician, radio presenter, and performer known for his contributions to ragga, reggae, and Afrobeat music in Uganda. He became popular in the 1990s and early 2000s as one of the artists that shaped Uganda's modern urban music scene.

== Early life and education ==
Orlando was born in 1974 and raised in Bugolobi, Kampala. He is the second born of eleven children to James Nsimbi (father) and Sylvia Nalumansi (mother).

He attended Kasasa Secondary School also called St. Mary's College Kasasa before joining the Law Development Center and dropped out in the first year after the loss of his father.

== Musical career ==
Orlandoh developed an interest in music during his school years, particularly in rap and performance. He later transitioned into professional music, becoming one of the early adopters of ragga and dancehall-influenced sounds in Uganda.

In the late 1990s, he rose to national recognition as part of the duo Orlandoh and Menton Summer, whose hit song “Sirikawo Baby” became widely popular in Uganda. Him alongside Ragga Dee, Iryn Namubiru and Messe formed a music group called The Homies.

He released several albums and songs that contributed to his popularity, including Kagutema, Nakonkona (2003), and Ffa Kumudaala Gwo (2005). His music stood out during a period when Congolese and Jamaican styles dominated the Ugandan music scene.

=== Discography ===
Some of his notable songs include:

- Sirikawo Baby
- Sinsonga
- Nsonyiwa
- Kagutema
- Nakonkona
- Koona Endongo
- Tugende
- Kaleete
- Tovanga Wendi
- Nina Akaama
- Haki Yange
- Ffa Kumudaala Gwo
- Ekisumuluzo
- Biloodi Wange
- Besiimye
- Akamuli
- Ngenda Kuba Ekyeeyo
- Ttamiro
- Leka Tuzirye
- Teli Mulala
- Tukola Bagaya
- Power
- Abadde Gwe
- Munda Muli
- Chioma
- Yegwe
- Mubaleke
- Obwoomu
- Musajja Mwavu
- Catalina
- Want to Party

== Radio career ==
In addition to music, Orlandoh has worked as a radio presenter, hosting programs on stations such as Radio Sanyu, Star FM, Suubi FM, and Dembe FM.

== See also ==
- Kadongo Kamu
- Kidandali
- Dancehall
- Reggae
- Ragga
- Music of Uganda
- Bebe Cool
- Jose Chameleone
- Bobi Wine
- Ragga Dee
