= Menton Summer =

Ugandan dancehall and reggae musician and radio presenter (died 1997)

- Born: Peter Nkwanga
- Origin: Uganda
- Died: 1997
- Genres: Dancehall, reggae
- Occupations: Musician, radio presenter
- Instruments: Vocals
- Years active: 1990s

Menton Summer (born Peter Nkwanga, died 1997) was a Ugandan dancehall and reggae musician and radio presenter. He is considered one of the pioneers of Uganda’s urban music movement in the 1990s along side Emperor Orlandoh, helping popularize Jamaican-influenced music styles in the country.

== Early life ==
Menton Summer was born Peter Nkwanga, son of Captain George Nkwanga, a military commander linked to the Federal Democratic Movement of Uganda (FEDEMU). He became known for his Rastafarian-inspired appearance, including dreadlocks, which were uncommon in Uganda’s mainstream entertainment scene at the time.

== Music career ==
Summer rose to prominence in the early 1990s during a period when Uganda’s music industry was transitioning from Congolese and Kadongo Kamu dominance toward urban genres influenced by Jamaican reggae and dancehall. He was part of a generation of artists including Emperor Orlandoh, Rasta Rob MC, and Ragga Dee, who helped introduce “ragga” and dancehall culture into Uganda’s urban music scene.

His popular songs included:

- Sirikawo Baby ft Emperor Orlandoh
- Kaneemu
- Leka Tuzilye

== Radio and media work ==
In addition to music, Menton Summer worked as a radio presenter at CBS FM, where he hosted programs such as Township Tunes and Saturday Club Mix. He also appeared in entertainment productions linked to the Ebonies, a theatre performance group he was one of actors they brought on board for their variety musical show that aired episodically on television.

== Death ==
Menton Summer died in 1997 in a road traffic accident at Nakalama along the Tirinyi Road while returning from a performance in Mbale as he was rushing to perform at Ekitoobero another event that was organized by CBS Radio.

== See also ==
- Music of Uganda
- Ugandan hip hop
- Ragga Dee
- Emperor Orlandoh
