= Grenia Nyamwija =

- Born: Grenia T. Nyamwija; December 15, 1993 (age 31); Nyamitanga, Mbarara, Uganda
- Genres: African Contemporary Music
- Occupation(s): Artist, Sound Engineer, Guitarist, Dancer
- Instrument: Guitar
- Years active: 2016–present
- Labels: Fantastic Five Band

Grenia T. Nyamwija (born 15 December 1993) is a Ugandan artist, sound engineer, guitarist, dancer, and motivational speaker. She began singing in Primary Four at St. Aloysius Primary School, where the school choir director selected her as lead vocalist for all performances and competitions. Grenia is a Catholic and is known for her versatile musical talents. She is currently working as a backup artist for the prominent Ugandan musician Ray G, gaining recognition for her dynamic stage presence and vocal abilities.

== Education ==
Grenia attended Mbarara Parents School for her lower primary education before moving to St. Aloysius Primary School, where she studied from Primary One to Primary Seven. She then joined Boni Consili Vocational School, Kyabirikwa, for both her O'Level (Uganda Certificate of Education) and A'Level (Uganda Advanced Certificate of Education) studies.

Afterwards, she enrolled at Makerere University to pursue a Bachelor of Arts in Performing Arts but was unable to complete the course due to financial constraints. She later joined Kampala Music School, where she specialized in voice training. Grenia eventually advanced her studies at Holex Sound Engineering Institute in Accra, Ghana, graduating in 2016 with a Diploma in Sound Management as the only female in her class.

== Career ==
While in Senior One, Grenia met seminarian Vincent Tumwebaze, who was recruiting members for a youth group called Youth Friends of Jesus (YFJ). She joined the group and began dancing in songs, occasionally recording and providing backup vocals.

During her time at Makerere University, she joined Dove Horizon, a youth group at St. Augustine Chapel Makerere University that ministers through dance and drama. She also became part of the university's cultural troupes, introduced to her by one of her lecturers. Due to financial constraints, she worked as a housemaid in Luzira, walking daily to campus. The long distance forced her to quit the job, and she moved in with friends in a small shanty house in Ndeeba, a Kampala slum.

Fr. Vincent Tumwebaze later connected her to another family, where she again worked as a maid in 2012. By then, she had dropped out of Makerere University, using her earnings to pay tuition at Kampala Music School.

In 2013 and 2014, she joined a project with Umoja Cultural Flying Carpet under the Norwegian Embassy, performing in Kenya (Nairobi), Tanzania, Ethiopia, and Uganda. In 2015, she left Uganda for Ghana, where she worked at the University of Cape Coast's Music Department, offering dance lessons to children. This work helped her save enough to enroll at Holex Sound Engineering Institute in Accra, Ghana. She graduated in 2016 with a Diploma in Sound Management, the only woman in her class, and returned to Uganda.

Back home, Grenia worked on a band project with Gertnam Studios under the Uganda Rural Electrification Agency. She later traveled to Tanzania, joining Nafasi Art Space in Dar es Salaam, a school for underprivileged but talented youth, where she taught African traditional dances. While in Tanzania, she also worked in Zanzibar on a Sauti za Busara project, a 45-minute stage performance about the story of Idi Amin, training dancers for the production.

In 2017, she moved to Nairobi, Kenya, to work at Blingers Empire, a center training gymnasts and dancers. She trained dancers there until 2019. In 2020, she opened her own dance and music studio in Nairobi, but it closed within three months due to Kenya's COVID-19 lockdown.

Grenia then returned to her parents' home in Mbarara, Uganda. During this time, Fr. Vincent Tumwebaze sponsored the recording of her song Murekye Akure, inspired by real-life COVID-19 events where many teenage girls became pregnant during the pandemic. Later, together with friends, she formed Routes & Culture Group, specializing in fusing traditional and urban music.

She also performed with bands such as Pulse UG, Gist Band, and Quest Band. It was during a Quest Band performance at Ray G's show at University Inn in Mbarara that she caught the musician's attention and was invited to become his solo backup singer. Her popularity grew after she single-handedly backed Ray G's Cricket Oval show in Kampala in 2024.

Today, Grenia is a member of the Fantastic Five Band and continues to work as Ray G's solo backup singer.

== Discography ==
1. Murekye Akure
2. My Praise ft Tizzie
3. Hosanna to you Lord ft Monica
4. You and I
5. Change me ft Papa Robert
6. Ninkusiima
7. Ekitiinwa
8. An Sylivia
9. Turyabasinguzi
10. Mwizi Marathon theme
