= Music education in Uganda =

Music education in Uganda has been an important part of the instructional system since the country won independence on October 9, 1962. At the time, the Ministry of Education published a national curriculum to standardize the content taught in public schools across the country. Music and other performing arts were included in this program. Many native, professional music educators who had received formal training outside Uganda contributed to these developments, including George Kakoma the composer of the Ugandan national anthem, Moses Serwadda, Mbabi Katana and Sennoga Zaake. They and others stressed that music must be taught throughout all stages of public education.

In August 2000, the Pan African Society for Music Education (PASME) was formed in Harare, Zimbabwe as a representative for the International Society for Music Education in Africa. The group changed its name to Pan African Society for Music Arts Education (PASMAE) at its 2001 meeting to represent the connected nature of dance, music, and theatre in African performing arts.

== Primary school syllabus ==
A new, two-part primary school syllabus was created in 2010 by the Ministry of Education and Sports for Performing Arts and Physical Education (PAPE) education in Uganda. The first part of this new set of standards focuses on incorporating more artistic fields such as music, dance, drama, visual arts, into Ugandan education systems.

Under this new curriculum, the primary focus of performing arts education is the teaching of indigenous instruments, traditional songs and traditional dances to students in an effort to preserve Ugandan culture. In the second term of the school year, the government hosts annual performing arts festivals at both the district and national levels as a part of the curriculum. Music, dance and drama performances are showcased at these events, and students spend a large part of the term in preparation for them.

== Institutions ==
=== Makerere University Music, Dance and Drama Department ===
The courses offered at Makerere University Music, Dance and Drama Department (MDD) are all market-oriented. They are tailored to the needs of students seeking a career in performing arts, as well to the needs of modern society. For example, for those who offer Fine Arts at A level, a lot of design work is done at MDD. For those interested in literature, both criticism and analysis are an integral part of study programs in Music, Dance and Drama. Those who study history, geography, divinity, economics, physics, mathematics or biology, encounter logic and therapy studies in the Music and Dance programs. They study anatomy, acoustics, drafting, physiotherapy and body movements under dance, aesthetics, social studies, communication, management and market studies under Drama.

==== History ====
The MDD Department started in 1971 as a modification of the teaching of the drama courses offered in the English department in the Faculty of Arts. In addition, the Ministry of Education expressed a need for music teachers in secondary schools, a service it was thought the new department could provide.

The MDD Department is the only school of performing arts in Eastern, Central and Southern Africa. Most of its programs employ an integrated approach to the performing arts. This approach is influenced by the sociocultural and political environment in which Ugangdan artists and theater audiences work/live.

==== Kampala Music School ====
Opening in 2001, after the successful acquisition of 40 pianos and other various instruments from the “Pianos for Uganda” charity effort, The Kampala Music School (KMS) provided the opportunity for its students to study genres including classical western, jazz and contemporary and traditional Ugandan music. KMS provides its students the chance to take The Associated Board of the Royal Schools of Music’s international examinations to ensure that they are exposed to high standards of music education.

==== ESOM School of Music ====
The ESOM School of Music started in 2006. The school offers lessons for instruments including piano, guitar, violin, wind instruments, bass, and drums. Lessons in vocal training, sound engineering, video production, and audio production are also offered.
