= Mc Norman =

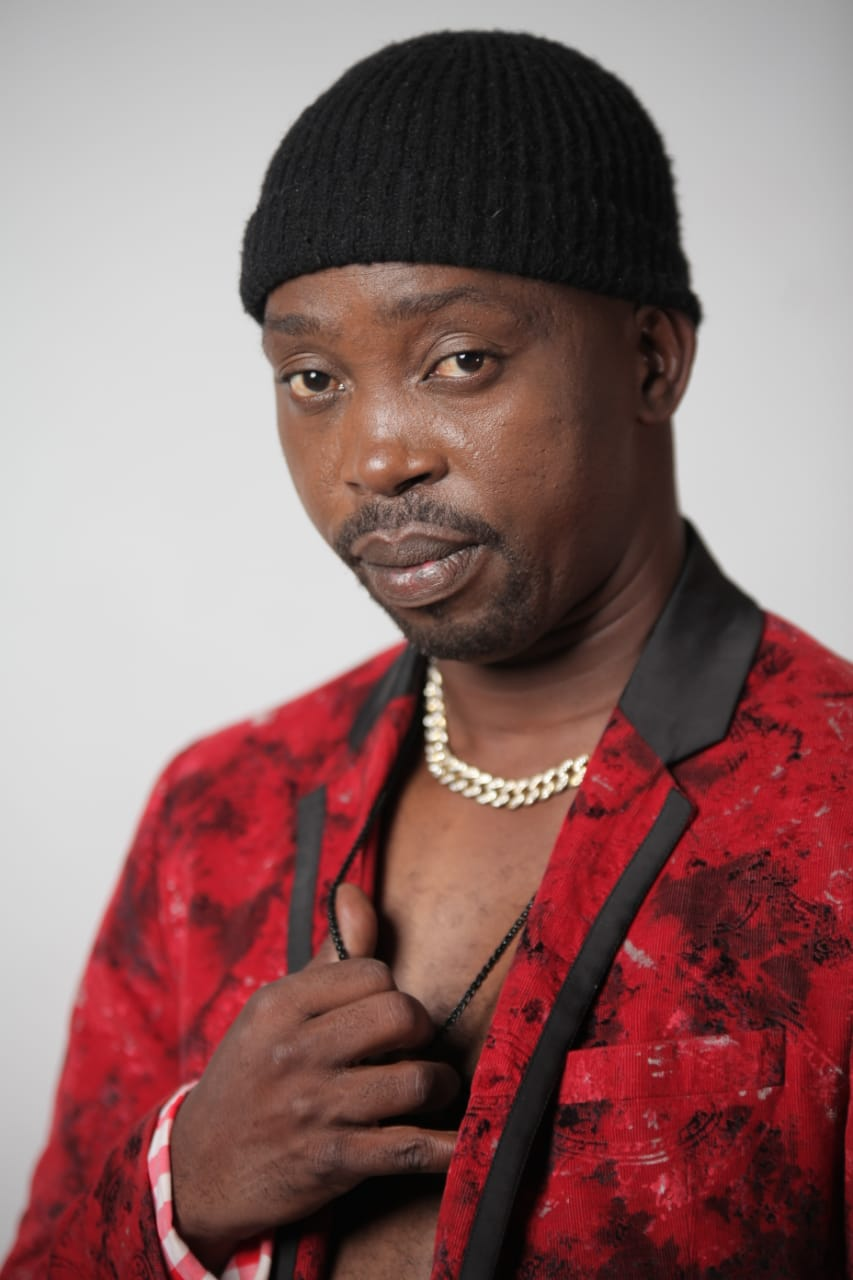

Background information
- Born: Ronald Mutebi; 6 November 1978 (age 47); Uganda
- Genres: Dancehall, Reggae Afrobeat
- Occupation: Musician
- Labels: iMusician Digital, CD Run, Celeb Africa, Sheer Group, symphonicms ,Virgin Music Group

Ronald Mutebi (born 6 November 1978), professionally known as Mc Norman is a Ugandan reggae, dancehall, and Afrobeat recording artist.

== Musical career ==
At the age of 12, Mc Norman (born Ronald Mutebi) began his career in the Afrigo Band, where he performed alongside Joanita Kawalya and Peterson Mutebi. He later joined MM Disco Sound at the Missouri Night Club, collaborating with Ivan Matama, DJ Lubba Style, and Rhino Kalemba. During this period, he also worked at the Missouri Club as a dancer and MC alongside Jose Chameleone and DJ Bernazor.

Norman established himself as a club DJ and versatile artist through his work with Sam Amooti and Paddy at Jaaja Ansinansi. He also performed at Vibration Disco Club with artists such as Papa Cidy and DJ Henry. In 1998, after a brief period at Vibes Sound, he moved to South Africa to join his brother, Philip Ganja, a former actor with the Bakayimbira Dramactors.

Together, the brothers founded Ganja Music Production, a music and film production company named after their father. They have collaborated with several South African Kwaito musicians, including Arthur Mafokate, Zombo, and Penny Penny. Their film division produced Welcome to South Africa, which reported sales of 2 million copies in Uganda and 5,000 copies in South Africa on its release date. They also produced Buladina, a tribute film about the life of musician Paulo Kafeero.

In his solo career, Norman collaborated with DJ Clap of the group Uhuru on the single "Wine Fi Mi," which featured the group Smile. He also worked with DJ Buckz and Zander Baronet on the single "Feel". His EP Cross Border included the track "Mulongo," a collaboration with Pallaso and Stanely Enow.

== Personal life ==
Mc Norman was born Norman Ganja. He comes from a musical family; his father, Eddy Ganja, Is a legendary guitarist for the Afrigo Band. He is the brother of actor and musician Philip Ganja.

At the age of 12, Mc Norman (born Ronald Mutebi) began his career in the Afrigo Band, where he performed alongside Joanita Kawalya and Peterson Mutebi. He later joined MM Disco Sound at the Missouri Night Club, collaborating with Ivan Matama, DJ Lubba Style, and Rhino Kalemba. During this period, he also worked at the Missouri Club as a dancer and MC alongside Jose Chameleone and DJ Bernazor. Mc Norman established himself as a club DJ and versatile artist through his work with Sam Amooti and Paddy at Jaaja Ansinansi. He also performed at Vibration Disco Club with artists such as Papa Cidy and DJ Henry. In 1998, after a brief period at Vibes Sound, he moved to South Africa to join his brother, Philip Ganja, a former actor with the Bakayimbira Dramactors.

Together, the brothers founded Ganja Music Production, a music and film production company named after their father. They have collaborated with several South African Kwaito musicians, including Arthur Mafokate, Zombo, and Penny Penny. Their film division produced Welcome to South Africa, which reported sales of 2 million copies in Uganda and 5,000 copies in South Africa on its release date. They also produced Buladina, a tribute film about the life of musician Paulo Kafeero.

In his solo career, Mc Norman collaborated with DJ Clap of the group Uhuru on the single "Wine Fi Mi," which featured the group Smile. He also worked with DJ Buckz and Zander Baronet on the single "Feel". His EP Cross Border included the track "Mulongo," a collaboration with Pallaso and Stanley Enow.

Mc Norman Discography 2013–2016

== Discography ==
=== Studio albums and EPs ===
Year	Title	Label	Details
2013	Lovers Rock (Ndiyabuza)	Sheer Group	Album
2015	Bam Bam	Celeb Africa	Album
2021	Cross Border	Independent	EP (5 tracks)
2023	Twelve	Celeb Africa	Album
2025	I'm No Longer a Slave to Fear	Independent	Single/EP

=== Notable singles ===
- "Wine Fi Mi" (feat. DJ Clap)
- "Feel" (feat. DJ Buckz)
- "Mulongo" (feat. Pallaso & Stanley Enow)
- "Agayaaye" (feat. King Saha)

== Awards ==
Won:

- 2014 HiPipo Music Awards (HiPipo Music Awards) – Best Chart Artist 2014
- 2019 HiPipo Best artist diaspora

Nominated:

- 2014 Afrimma awards – Best African Dancehall Artist Nominee Texas United States
- 2014 IRAWMA awards – 2014 Best world new entertainer (IRAWMA awards) Florida Miami
- 2014 HiPipo Music Awards - 2014 Best reggae song, best diaspora artist, best chart artist
- 2019 HiPipo Music Awards -Best artist Diaspora
