= Jjumba Lubowa Aligaweesa =

Ugandan musician, culturist, and spiritual leader

- Origin: Buganda, Uganda
- Genres: Kadongo kamu, folk, traditional African
- Occupations: Musician, culturist, traditional healer, spiritualist
- Years active: 2020s–present
- Label: Bam Records

Jjumba Lubowa Aligaweesa is a Ugandan musician, traditional healer, herbalist, and culturist from the Buganda region. He is known for blending traditional African instruments with modern musical production to promote and preserve Ugandan cultural heritage.

== Early life and background ==
Aligaweesa was raised in the Buganda region of Uganda, an environment deeply rooted in ancestral customs and traditions, which influenced his later careers in both music and traditional spiritual practice.

== Career ==
Aligaweesa is a practitioner of Kadongokamu and traditional folk music. His compositions typically feature traditional African instruments such as drums, strings, and guitars, integrated with narrative storytelling that covers cultural, social, and spiritual themes. He recorded notable traditional tracks, including "Ndawula", which was produced by Bam Pro under the Bam Records label.

In 2025, Aligaweesa received international recognition for his song "Stress", earning nominations and winning an award at the Hollywood Independent Music Awards (HIMA) in the traditional/global music categories. In early 2026, he released his studio album, Super Power, a project described as a cultural and spiritual statement accompanied by conceptual music videos exploring traditional African imagery.

Aside from music, Aligaweesa operates as a prominent traditional healer, counselor, and spiritualist in Uganda. He leverages digital platforms like TikTok and Facebook to host live sessions, teaching viewers about ancestral connections, indigenous medicine, and the preservation of African cultural identity. He has also traveled internationally to represent Ugandan traditions, performing cultural exhibitions and rituals in the United Kingdom, including England, Wales, and Scotland.

== Discography ==
=== Albums ===
- Super Power (2026)

=== Singles ===
- "Ndawula"
- "Stress"

== Awards and nominations ==
Year	Award	Category	Nominated work	Result
2025	Hollywood Independent Music Awards	Traditional / Folk	"Stress"	Won

== See Also ==
Kadongo Kamu

Kidandali

Baganda music
