= George William Kyeyune =

Ugandan artist and academic (born 1962)

- Born: 1962 (age 63–64); Masaka, Kyanamukaka Subcounty, Uganda
- Occupations: Artist and Academic

Professor George William Kyeyune (born 1962) is an artist and professor at the Makerere University, Kampala, Uganda. He lectures in sculpture and history of African art at the College of Engineering, Design, and Technology – Makerere University, with research interest in contemporary art and metal casting technology. He is also the vicar of the Namirembe Cathedral of the Church of Uganda.

== Early life ==
Prof. George Kyeyune was born in 1962 into a traditional Ugandan family at Masaka, Kyanamukaaka Subcounty in central Uganda. At an early age, he started depicting signs of an artist by drawing pictures using the ground as his canvas. This later translated into a career in art (painting and sculpture).

== Education ==
Prof. George Kyeyune was a product of the then Margaret Trowell School of Fine Arts (now Margaret Trowell School of Industrial and Fine Arts), where he graduated with a Bachelor of Fine Art in 1985. And later obtained a Diploma in Education the following year. Prof. George Kyeyune obtained a Master of Fine Arts Degree from the Maharaja Sayajirao University of Baroda, India with speciality in Sculpture. In 1999, Prof. George Kyeyune received a scholarship from the Commonwealth Scholarship Commission to Study for his PhD in Art History at the School of Oriental and African Studies (SOAS), University of London.

== Career ==
Prof. George Kyeyune returned from India and took up a teaching position in sculpture at his former school. He is currently an associate professor at the College of Engineering, Design, and Technology – Makerere University. He also does sculpture and painting for exhibitions. Some of his works includes: The Kampala I Will Always Come Back To (2011); At the Salon (2011); Gossip I & II (2011); Telephone Call (2011); Roadside Vendor (2011); Boodaboda I, II & III (2011); En Route from Mbale (1983) and Jesus Writing in the Sand (1983) among others.

== Personal life ==
Prof. George Kyeyune is father to the Ugandan musician Ragga Dee (born Daniel Kazibwe).
