= Tondism faith =

Indigenous African faith in Uganda

Tondism Faith
- Type: Indigenous African spirituality
- Leader: Jjumba Lubowa Aligaweesa
- Region: East Africa (principally Uganda)
- Headquarters: Kirowooza, Mukono, Uganda
- Other name: Enzikiriza Y'obuwangwa N'ennono

The Tondism Faith (indigenously known as Enzikiriza Y'obuwangwa N'ennono) is an organized indigenous African religion and traditional spiritual movement centered primarily in Uganda. The faith focuses on the revival, preservation, and institutionalization of traditional African spirituality, ancestral reverence, and cultural heritage.

The institutional movement is headed by a centralized leadership council under a High Priest (Ssaabakabona). The faith operates multiple sacred sites, shrines, and regional administrative structures across Uganda.

== Beliefs and Practices ==
Tondism is rooted in the belief of a supreme creator entity (referred to as Tonda or Ssewamala Musoke in various contexts) and the reverence of ancestral spirits and cultural oracles.

Key structural and liturgical practices include:

- Ancestral Reverence: Ritual worship sessions designed to connect adherents with African ancestors and spiritual lineages.
- Ordination and Baptism: The faith utilizes formal rites of passage, including the ordination of traditional priests (Bakabona) and the initiation/baptism of followers.
- Annual Conventions: The movement organizes large-scale national assemblies, such as the annual Amada ga Ssewamala convention, which features traditional music, dances, spiritual divinations, and theological graduations.
- Cultural Festivals: The faith sponsors public cultural advocacy events, including the Kampala Tuzze Cultural Festival, aimed at celebrating and conserving African traditions among urban youth.

== Leadership and Structure ==
The faith features a formalized hierarchy reminiscent of orthodox religious administrations.

=== The High Priest ===
The spiritual and administrative head of the Tondism Faith is the High Priest (Ssaabakabona), Jjumba Lubowa Aligaweesa. Consecrated into high leadership in the late 2010s, Jjumba oversees the faith’s national synod, performs key theological ordinations, and spearheads public advocacy for the recognition of African indigenous spirituality. Under his tenure, the organization has established structural commissions covering finance, liturgy, justice, and media development.

=== Educational and Administrative Development ===
Tondism operates a Liturgical Office that trains clergy candidates in traditional theology and indigenous ethics. In the 2020s, the faith actively pursued broadcasting frameworks, lobbying the Uganda Communications Commission (UCC) to expedite the licensing of Ennono TV and Radio to propagate traditional teachings via mainstream media.

== Socio-Political Involvement ==
The leadership of the Tondism Faith frequently engages in public discourse regarding civil peace, national unity, and decolonization. High Priest Jjumba has publicly called on state authorities and the electorate to maintain peaceful co-existence during national election cycles while advocating for equal civic respect toward practitioners of indigenous African religions.

The faith maintains connections with historical cultural sites in Uganda, such as the preservation efforts surrounding the Budhagali ancestral sites in Busoga.

== See also ==
- Traditional African religion
- Religion in Uganda
- Clans of Baganda
