= Jimmy Katumba =

- Born: 1955; Uganda
- Died: August 13, 2006 (aged 50–51)
- Spouse: Stella Nanteza (deceased)

Jimmy Katumba (1955 – 13 August 2006) was a Ugandan popular music singer. Starting out as a singer of gospel music in his early years, he rose to fame as the country's premier pop star from late-1970s to the 1990s. Jimmy Katumba helped shape popular music in Uganda and has earned a place among the country’s leading music artists. His band, The Ebonies, dominated the Ugandan music scene in the 1980s and 1990s.

== Early childhood ==
Katumba was born to Reverend Blasio Katumba and Alice Nakyagaba. His music career started in the numerous church choirs to which he belonged. He attended eight schools including Makerere College School and Lubiri Secondary School.

== Music ==
Katumba started his music career as an eight-year-old singer in Mukono Church of Uganda where his father was a preacher. In 1977, he formed the Light Bearers, which he renamed Jimmy Katumba and the Ebonies. Popularly known for his baritone voice, Katumba became celebrated for songs like "Twalina Omukwano," "Drums of Africa" and "Fa Kukyolina." He left for the UK in 1990. He went to the United States in 1992 and returned in 1995.

== Discography ==
- Atalina Kigere
- Congratulations
- Usiuwe Tembo - 1990
- Queen of Love - 1981

== See also ==
- Geoffrey Oryema
- Music of Uganda
