= Uganda YMCA =

YMCA in Uganda was founded in 1959. It has six main branches, including Kampala YMCA. Other branches are in Jinja, Mukono, Mbale, Mbarara, Kasese.

== History ==
The first mention of a YMCA in Uganda was made in a 1913 report of the World Alliance. The matter rested until 1947, when the World YMCA in Geneva sent Dr. George Haynes to investigate the possibilities for YMCAs in Africa. He met in Uganda E. M. K. Mulira. As a result, the present site for the Headquarters, currently in Kampala YMCA's building there, was chosen.

Later, in 1959, a meeting on 12 June convened by A. R. Russell, then acting director of African Housing, and with nine people attending, discussed the formation of Uganda YMCA. A further meeting on 28 July was chaired by Dr. Leslie Brown, Bishop of Uganda, and the first committees were appointed.

The World Alliance then dispatched Merlin Bishop to Uganda; and on the strength of his report YMCA of the USA showed interest in the formation of Uganda YMCA. Two fraternal secretaries were sent in response to a January 1960 application of the formation committee.

Dan. P. Tyler arrived in Uganda in 1961 and started YMCA at Kampala. Moses Perry in October 1962 started the branch at Jinja. In May 1965 a third branch was opened in Mbarara; and the fourth branch was at Gulu.

Uganda YMCA became prominent by its hosting of representatives of around 80 countries, in July 1973 in the 6th YMCA World Council meeting, in Kampala. It was from this meeting that YMCA's Kampala Principles derive.

== Organisation ==
Uganda YMCA as of 2006 is active in six districts, as mentioned above. The Gulu branch was shut down as a result of the insurgency in the northern part of the country.

All activities are co-ordinated by the National Secretariat at Kampala, consisting of the National Secretary General, two deputies, and support staff. The Secretariat co-ordinates branch activities, but also manages its own, including the Computer School.

== Activities ==
These include children's camps, and children's Christmas parties (at which Mr and Miss YMCA are selected). There is participation in youth exchange programmes: the USA-based International Camp Counselor Programme, and the Multi-National Leadership Training Programme at Snow Mountain Ranch.

The National Secretariat manages YMCA's Complex at Jinja, hired out for conference and leisure use.

The Computer School is located at Kampala YMCA, and operates in parallel with the separate Kampala YMCA Computer School. It offers a diploma in Computer Science and Business Studies; and also a special institutional programme for those in higher education; computer maintenance and a course in maintenance of peripherals and mobiles phones; and an internet café.

== Branch activities ==
Each branch has affiliated clubs and corresponding activities. The branch programmes are based on that of Kampala YMCA. Extra features are as follows:

=== Jinja YMCA ===
- Social development course
- A modern children's park and playground
- Zebra crossing maintenance
- computer courses
- Nursery Teacher Education
- Catering
- Tailoring and Fashion Design
- Hair Dressing and Cosmetology
- Guidance and Counseling
- Commercial Courses

=== Mukono YMCA ===
- Kakinzi YMCA Day and Boarding School, which serves as an orphanage
- Beautician course

=== Kasese YMCA ===
- Carpentry and joinery
- Brick-making and concrete practice
- Agroforestry

== National Secretary-General ==
- Roselyne Birungi Sebaleke (2020 - )
- Robert Joseph Jjumba (1994–2019)
- Bart Kiggundu (1990–1994)
- Elia Wabwire Muwesa (1987–1989)
- Nelson Mugerwa (1982–1987)
- G. William Muwanga (1981–1982)
- E. K. K. Sempebwa (1974–1981)

(From Uganda YMCA update profile, Issue 2, 2000)
