= Bernard Kabanda =

- Olugendo Cover, Kabanda on guitar, Bakkabulindi on marakas

Background information
- Born: 1959
- Origin: Kampala
- Died: 4 September 1999 (aged 39–40)
- Genres: Kadongo Kamu
- Years active: Unknown – 1999
- Label: Real World Records

Bernard Kabanda Sslongo (1959 – 4 September 1999) was an Ugandan guitarist. He had just realised fame in the world music circuit through his appearances at WOMAD in the US and the UK in 1999 before he died of AIDS less than two months after his performance at Womad's Reading festival, aged only 40.

Before he died, he recorded an album with Womad, called Olugendo.

He was discovered in the streets of Kampala, Uganda's capital, playing on a guitar he had made himself out of scrap. He was content to play solo, or with simple tin-can percussion as he played in pubs in Kampala, and he did so also in his Womad tour, where he played with Samuel Bakkabulindi Sslongo, who played makeshift shakers and tin-cans with drum sticks.
