= Herman Basudde =

Ugandan Musician (1958-1997)

- Born: December 5, 1958; Uganda
- Died: June 11, 1997 (aged 38); Kabale Bugonzi
- Years active: 1980–1997
- Known for: Kadongo Kamu

Herman Basudde (December 5, 1958 – June 11, 1997) was a Ugandan Kadongo Kamu musician.

== Background ==
Herman Basudde was born on 5 December 1958 in the Masaka District, ⁣⁣Uganda⁣⁣, to Eria Katende and Dimitiria Namyalo. He attended Kibanda Primary School and Kitenga Primary School, where he sang in the school choir. He reportedly did not continue his education beyond primary school.

Brown Rodgers, a friend of Eria (Basudde's father) during World War II, gave him a guitar after the war. Basudde became deeply interested in the instrument, dedicating much time to practice. His mother, Dimitiria, reportedly wanted him to focus more on housework or schoolwork, while his father, Eria, encouraged his musical pursuits. Due to financial struggles, Basudde left school and focused on music.

He soon became known locally, entertaining guests at village parties with his guitar and songs in exchange for payment. His growing popularity reportedly led to jealousy among local youths, who attempted to force him out of the area.

== Career ==
Livingstone Kasozi reportedly mentored Basudde, teaching him to play the guitar, sing, and perform live on stage. He (Basudde) later toured East African countries, including Kenya, Tanzania, and Rwanda.

Basudde is regarded as a musician who helped revive interest in bakisimba, blending elements of Western and Kiganda music. He had a husky voice and often sang songs about love affairs, philandering husbands, and witchcraft. In the song, Ekiwuka Ekyaga Muntamu, Basudde used metaphor to address the AIDS epidemic in Uganda, portraying a narrator who dreams of a lizard-like insect invading his home and despoiling life, food, and sex.

Basudde died in an accident while traveling to his parents' house in Masaka, south of Kampala.

Some accounts describe him as rebellious, noting that he left the Catholic Church to adopt animism. He was allegedly criticized by some clergy for abandoning religion in favor of witchcraft and accused of sensationalizing his music by using provocatively dressed dancers and commercializing the Kadongo Kamu genre.

== Popularity ==
According to historian Basaaya Rocks Peter, some believed Herman Basudde could foretell future events. Fred Ssebatta, another Kadongo Kamu musician, stated that Basudde was creative and quick at composing music making it difficult for others to match his skill. Whenever Basudde released a song, Ssebatta would respond promptly.

On 12 October 2012, Bobi Wine paid tribute to Herman Basudde's work, stating, "How I wish prophet Herman Basudde could be around. He left us to accomplish his mission, but his shoes are far too big for us to wear." Basudde reportedly composed music entirely in his head and could not repeat what he had previously sung. He toured several East African countries, including Kenya, Tanzania and Rwanda; this tour reportedly earned him over USH 70 million.

== Death and legacy ==
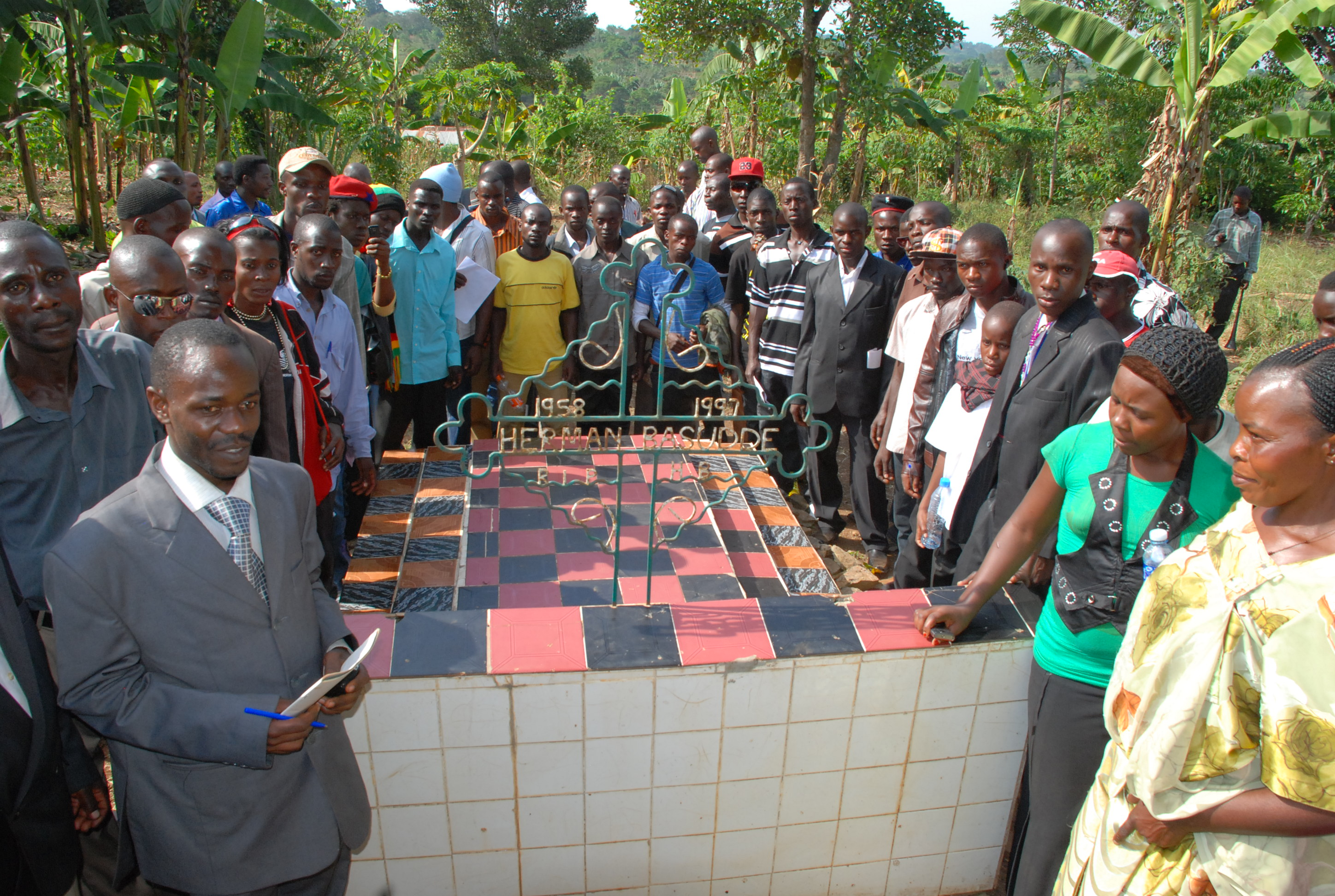
Grave of Basudde in Bubondo

According to some accounts, Basudde's words and actions shortly before his death were seen as premonitions. Aisha Nakito said that on 10 June 1997, just days after returning from an East African tour, he met Jane Basirika for a meal while waiting for Serunjoji. When Serunjoji's arrived, Basudde embraced him, having reconciled after earlier misunderstandings at a family reunion. They then departed for Masaka, where his father was bedridden due to paralysis.

On their way, they stopped at a road toll at Lukaya for a snack, where Basudde argued with a man. Sylvester Busuulwa intervened, but Basudde, still agitated, drove off at high speed. As his vehicle approached the village of Kabaale Bugonzi, a lorry attempted to overtake him causing him to lose control. The vehicle overturned several times, resulting in his death.

Before his passing, he reportedly requested to be buried with his favorite guitar, noting that his colleague, Livingstone Kasozi, had been buried with his favorite cassette tape.
