= Christopher Evans (musician) =

Ugandan musician

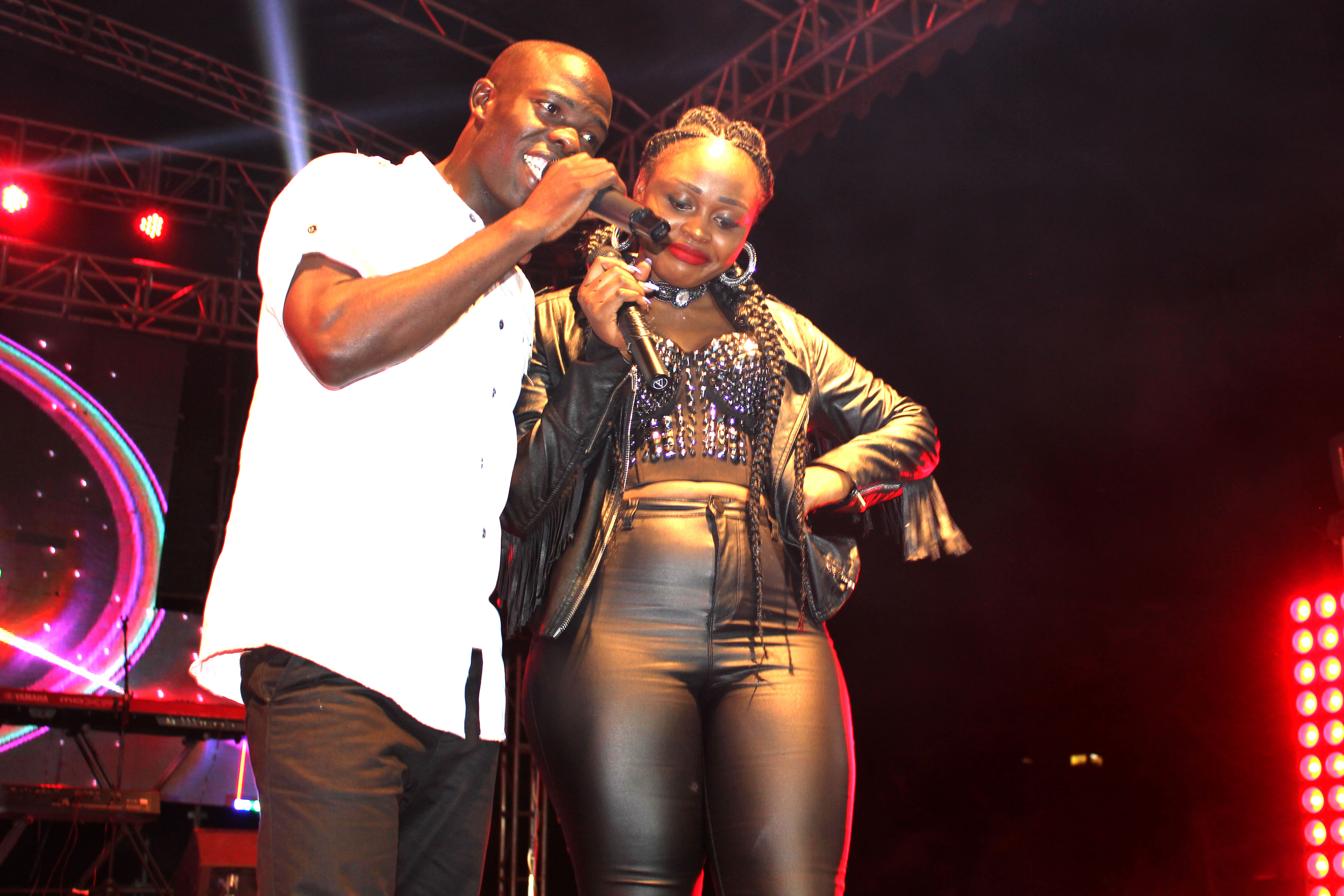
- Background Information
- Born: Christopher Evans Kaweesi; 1987 (age 38–39); Uganda
- Other name: Chris Evans
- Citizenship: Uganda
- Education: General Education; St. Mary's Boarding Secondary School Kitende, Kajjansi, Wakiso District, Uganda
- Occupations: Musician, entertainer
- Years active: 2007 – present
- Known for: Music
- Relatives: Gertrude Mirembe (Sister); Samuel Mwesigwa (Paternal Uncle)

Christopher Evans (born Christopher Evans Kaweesi; 1987) commonly known as Chris Evans is a Ugandan songwriter, recording and performing artist. He composes and sings in a genre of Ugandan music known as Kidandali.

== Overview ==
Chris Evans is one of Uganda's most popular musicians in the 21st century. In July 2013, BigEye.Ug, a Ugandan music website listed him as one of the 256 Best Ugandan Music Artistes Of All Time. Chris Evans sings primarily in his native Luganda. As of January 2014, he had released about ten singles

In 2015 Evans teamed up with Rema Namakula to compose, record and perform a duet named Linda (translates as "Wait" in Luganda). The single received the "Best RnB Song" at the "HiPipo Music Awards" in 2015, at a ceremony held at the Kampala Serena Hotel.

== Early life and education ==
Christopher Evans Kaweesi was born to Christopher Kakooza, a construction worker and Mrs. Kakooza, a housewife. His mother died while he was still a baby and his father died when Kaweesi was about 13 or 14 years old. He paid for his elementary and middle school education by performing menial jobs at construction sites and at school.

He passed his O-Level examinations with flying colors, scoring 14 points in 8 subjects (the best possible score is 8). His paternal uncle, sponsored his A-Level education at St. Mary’s Boarding Secondary School, Kitende, a good residential mixed high school, in Kajjansi, off of the Kampala-Entebbe Road. At Kitende, Kaweesi studies Physics, Chemistry and Biology, with Mathematics as a minor subject.

He was admitted to Makerere University on a Uganda Government scholarship to study Agriculture. He enrolled, attended classes, but never graduated. Instead, he used the contacts at the university, to launch his musical career.

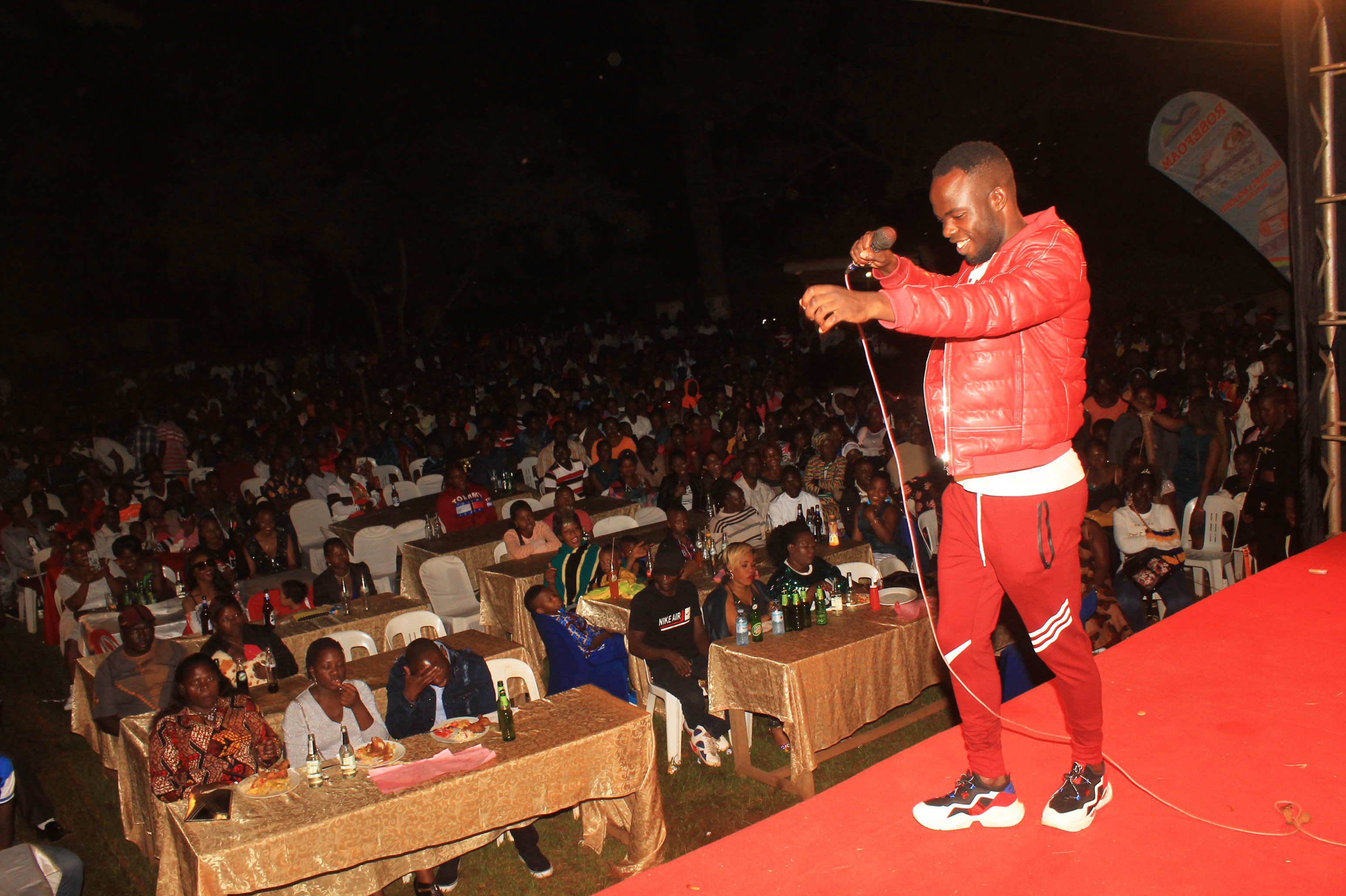
Chris Evans Kaweesi

== Discography ==
- Ow'ekisa
- Rihanna
- Kankole Byenkola
- Ndikusasulaki
- Bwolonda
- Abafumbo
- Mulungi
- Nsaasira

== See also ==
- Juliana Kanyomozi
- Jose Chameleon
- Rema Namakula
- Afrigo Band
