= Stella Nanteza =

- Born: May , 1956
- Origin: Uganda
- Died: June 20, 2014 (aged 58) Mulago Hospital, Kampala
- Genres: Gospel, Drama-Musical Theatre
- Occupations: Musician, Vocalist, Performing Artist
- Years active: 1977–2014
- Spouse: Jimmy Katumba (deceased)

Stella Nanteza (May 1956 – 20 June 2014) was a Uganda musician and co-founder of the Ebonies, a Ugandan drama and music group that gained popularity at a national level during the 1980s. She and Jimmy Katumbawere instrumental in forming popular philippic music in Uganda and secured a place in the country’s top music artists. Their band, The Ebonies, ruled the Ugandan music scene in the ’80s and ’90s

== Early life ==
Stella Nanteza was born in May 1956 to Josephat Ssembajjwe Kyazze. She began her musical journey around 1977, setting the stage for a career that would leave a lasting mark on Uganda’s entertainment industry.

== Musical career and The Ebonies ==
Nanteza was a co-founder of The Ebonies, a Ugandan drama and music group that rose to national prominence in the 1980s. Working closely with the late Jimmy Katumba, a Ugandan vocalist, who was also her spouse. In her earlier years of the career, she was part of the Masoli church of Uganda Choir together with her spouse Jimmy Katumba.

Some of the most notable songs in which she featured include;

- Muyita Mulokozi
- Cast Your Burdens
- Kamutendereze
- Abaana Ba Katonda
- Instrumental
- Jangu Eno
- Kwata Omukono
- Mukama Ye Musumba Wange
- Olyokanga Nojja

Her work helped bridge drama and music in Uganda, and she played a crucial role in shaping the group’s unique blend of music, storytelling, and theatrical performance.

== Life abroad ==
Stella Nanteza moved as a child to the United Kingdom (with her family) in the late 1990s and lived there for 17 years before coming to the United States to retired. She stayed in touch with the Ugandan community during this time, yet remained a celebrated figure in the arts community.

In tribute to her memory, The Ebonies dedicated part of their 2015 New Year production, Entununsi, to Nanteza. One of the emotional highlights was a performance of Emitima Egilumwa Okwagala, one of her most beloved songs, sung by group member Hilda Manaso.

== Legacy ==
Stella Nanteza’s impact on Uganda’s cultural landscape is profound. As both a vocalist and performing artist, she played an essential role in merging traditional music with modern Ugandan theatrical storytelling. Her voice and presence continue to inspire musicians and performers across generations. She is remembered not only for her powerful vocals and dramatic range but also for the warmth, grace, and artistic integrity she brought to every stage she stepped on.

== Passing and tributes ==
Nanteza died on June 20, 2014, due to shock after the car she was in got involved in an accident in Kyebando, Kampala. She was rushed to Mulago Hospital after the accident where she died from and was laid to rest on June 22, 2014, in Buso Namulonge along Gayaza Road in central Uganda. Her death marked the end of an era for many fans of The Ebonies and Ugandan performing arts at large.

== See also ==
- Jimmy Katumba
