= Kidandali =

Subgenre of house music

- Stylistic origins: Kadongo Kamu; soukous; dancehall
- Cultural origins: Mid 1990s, Kampala Uganda
- Typical instruments: Bass guitar; electric guitar; trumpet; keyboard; synthesizer; sampler; percussion; vocals

Regional scenes
- Uganda; Kenya; Ethiopia

Kidandali is a stylistic music genre featuring the use of native sounds and samples from Uganda. Kidandali is a word from the Ganda language which in translation can mean "local party" or "celebration". Music concerts and traditional wedding ceremonies (kwanjula) are examples of such "bidandali". The music itself is given this name because most times it is the kind of music played or performed at such local parties and functions. Some other sources and commentators refer to the genre alternatively as "Band music" while others refer to it as "afrobeat".

== Form ==
Stylistically, this genre draws directly from two other music genres while indirectly drawing from another. The two genres being Kadongo Kamu and Soukous (lingala). Indirectly, Kidandali is most times cemented by the Dem Bow riddim, a result of the early Ragga influence on Ugandan pop music. The similarity and influence of Kadongo Kamu is seen in the role played by the bass guitar. The bass guitar is the most pronounced instrument and it controls the rhythm and tempo of the song just like in kadongo kamu. The playing pattern is also very similar. Another area where kadongo kamu influence is visible is in the way the vocals are delivered. The music themes are also similar to kadongo kamu. Story telling and giving of advice to listeners is common place. In regards to lingala, the influence is seen in the role the other instruments play, most notably the lead guitar and electric guitar, which are played in a pattern similar to that in lingala music. The use of trumpets is similar to that in lingala. All these factor into making it the most organic style of music in Uganda.

== History ==
The roots of this genre can be traced back to the bands that sprung up after independence. The Cranes Band, which later gave birth to Afrigo Band, can be regarded as the first group in the evolution process of this genre. At the very outset, their music was heavily influenced by soukous and Congolese artists such as Franco were notable influences at the time. Jazz and funk was also a notable influence. Along the way there were other bands including Rwenzori Band, Big Five Band and Simba Ngoma Band; but Afrigo was the most prominent and most enduring, especially throughout the political unrest of the 1970s to 1990s. By the mid 1990s Afrigo Band was still heavily influenced by lingala music, which by then was dominant all over the African continent.

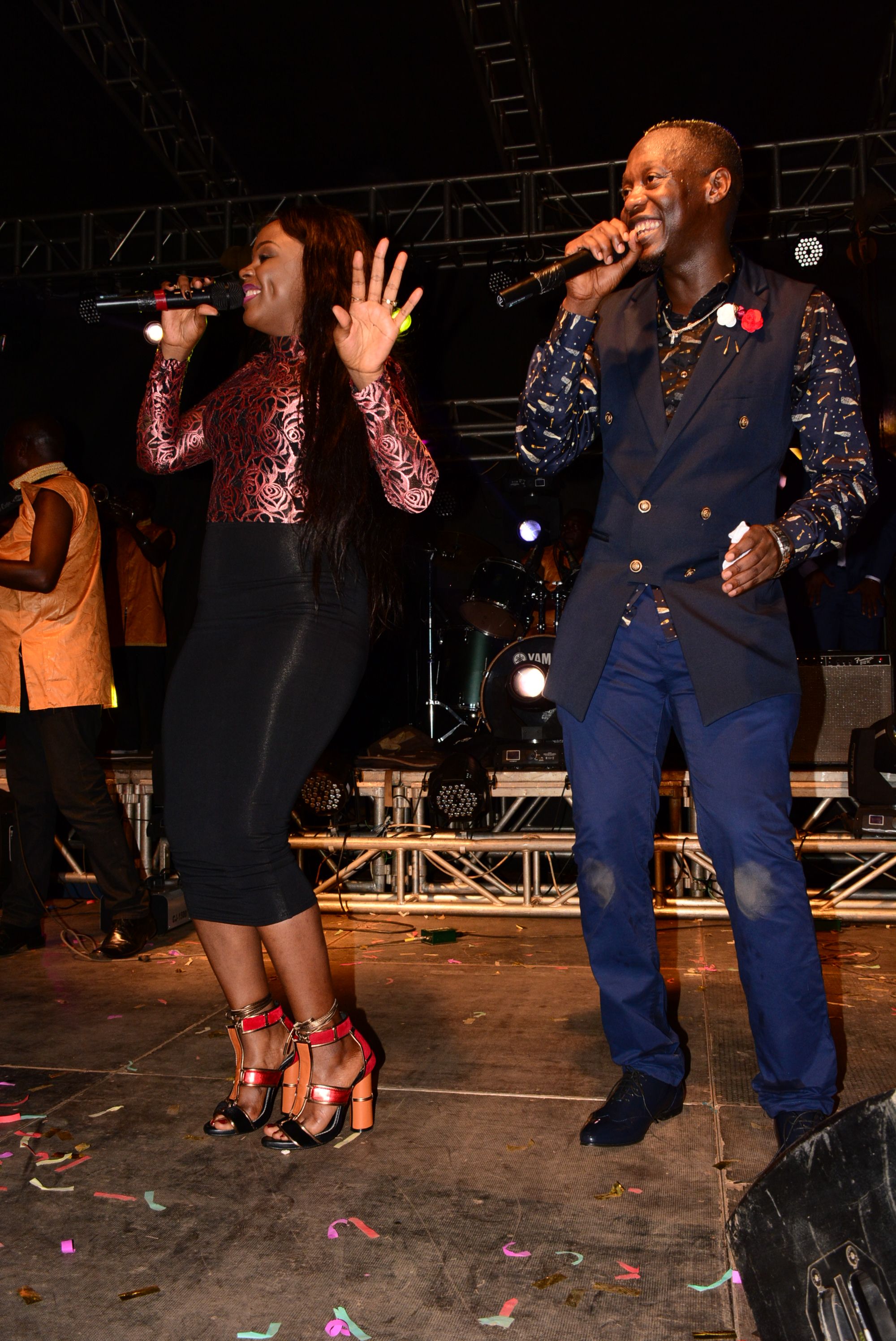
Mesach Ssemakula and Rema

Artists such as Joanita Kawalya and Rachael Magoola were part of Afrigo and helped lay the foundation for modern day kidandali, alongside other bands such as Kaads Band. The turning point, however, came with the formation of the record label Eagles Production which was responsible for producing Mesach Semakula, Geoffrey Lutaaya, Ronald Mayinja and Haruna Mubiru.

These artists took the mantle from Afrigo band and further developed the genre after the turn of the century. The label continued to produce more talent, especially female artists such as Cathy Kusasira, Irene Namatovu and Stecia Mayanja. Another turning point was around 2007 when David Lutalo broke through with the hit song "Kapapala" creating the way for the genre to move beyond the Eagles Production label and for other solo artists to join the fray.

About the same time, technology in audio production had enabled the genre to be reproduced digitally using Audio Workstations and the "band" element had all but disappeared. Recording studios such as Kann, Dream Studios, Mozart and Paddyman took center stage. Many other independent solo artists started to practice the genre. Artists such as Dr Tee, Martin Angume and even Chameleone achieved success with this genre. The genre is currently at the peak of its evolution with newer artists such as Papa Cidy and Chris Evans helping create a dominant force in Ugandan music.

== Notable artists ==
The genre has had a number of notable artists, namely:-

- Ragga Dee
- Bebe Cool
- Bobi Wine
- Goodlyfe crew
- Mega Dee
- Kalifah Aganaga

== See also ==
- Kadongo Kamu
- Soukous
- Music of Uganda
