= Paulo Kafeero =

Ugandan Kadongo kamu Musician

Paul Job Kafeero
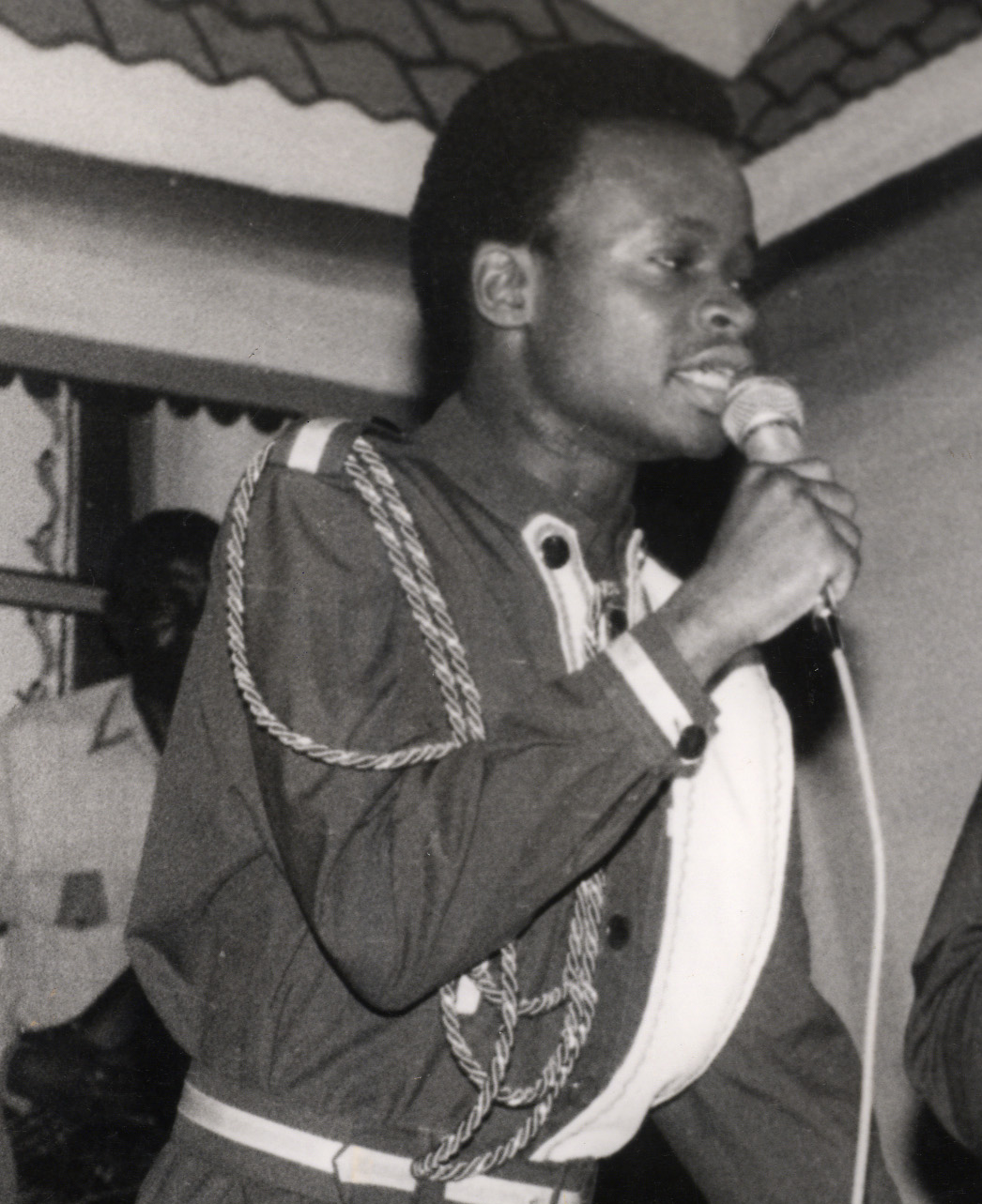
- Born: 12 July 1970; Uganda
- Died: 17 May 2007 (aged 36); Mulago, Kampala, Uganda
- Citizenship: Uganda
- Occupation: musician
- Years active: 1988–2007
- Known for: music

Paulo Kafeero born Paul Job Kafeero and musically or commonly known as Prince Job Paulo Kafeero(Golden boy of Africa)(12 July 1970 – 17 May 2007) was a Ugandan Afro-folk singer. He is regarded as one of the pioneers of the local Ugandans Genre Kadongo Kamu (One Drum\beat), Kafeero won the Pearl of Africa Music Awards for best Kadongo Kamu artist/group.

== Early life and education ==
Kafeero began school at Nkokonjjeru Demonstration Primary School in 1977, and went on to Ngogwe Baskerville secondary school. In the same year he began school, his father left the family because of his mother's opposition to his interest in music, he went to stay in the nearby village of Masaba with his older sister Grace and her husband. Grace's husband intermittently paid his school fees after his father's abandonment. With no secure source of school fees, Kafeero did not finish secondary school.

He earned money by making bricks, cultivating beans, selling used clothes, and tailoring. Kafeero's father gave no further support and had no contact with his son until he became famous.

== Career ==
Paulo Kafeero had a notable career as a musician and songwriter, leaving a lasting impact on Uganda's music scene. His musical journey began in the 1990s, where he gained recognition for his distinctive style and powerful vocal abilities.

Kafeero primarily focused on the genre of Kadongo Kamu, which is traditional folk music in Uganda. His songs featured emotionally charged lyrics that addressed various themes such as love, social issues, and cultural identity. His music resonated with audiences across the country, contributing to his popularity and prominence in Ugandan music.

One of Kafeero's notable songs, Dippo Nazigala played a significant role in his breakthrough and established him as a prominent figure in Uganda's music industry. The song's success showcased Kafeero's talent and contributed to his overall career trajectory.

Throughout his career, Kafeero released multiple albums and singles that garnered both critical acclaim and a loyal fan base. His songs often addressed social and political issues, offering a platform for expressing the experiences and aspirations of Ugandans. Kafeero's performances were known for their high energy and passionate delivery, captivating audiences during his live shows.

Kafeero died on 17 May 2007, at the age of 36 due to complications from kidney failure. His untimely death was a significant loss to Uganda's music industry, and he is remembered as a talented musician and songwriter who made a lasting impact.

== Legacy and aftermath ==
=== Musical influence and tributes ===
Following his death in May 2007, Kafeero's extensive catalog of 83 songs across 21 albums has continued to experience widespread circulation and active airplay across East Africa, solidifying his status as a permanent pillar of the Kadongo Kamu genre. Musicologists and cultural commentators frequently reference his 1994 masterpiece, "Walumbe Zaaya," as a masterclass in the linguistics and oral literature of the Luganda language due to its complex narrative poetry and absence of repetitive phrasing.

Annual memorial services are regularly held in Uganda to honor his legacy. Fellow Ugandan musicians, cultural figures, and political leaders have frequently used these gatherings to advocate for the preservation of traditional folk music, often citing Kafeero’s distinct storytelling format as the benchmark for educational social commentary in Ugandan music history. His final resting place at his ancestral home in Nkokonjeru, Buikwe District, remains a prominent cultural landmark visited by music enthusiasts and researchers.

=== Estate and paternity disputes ===
For nearly two decades following Kafeero's passing, his estate spanning properties and extensive landholdings in Kajjansi, Kyaggwe, and Buikwe became the subject of intense familial legal battles. The conflict escalated among more than 20 individuals claiming to be his biological children, resulting in accusations against the recognized estate administrators for unlawfully disposing of family properties.

Although the High Court initially blocked exhumation requests in May 2021 and directed family members to utilize existing, archived laboratory blood samples instead, state forensic medical experts later declared the older blood samples unviable for processing.

On 1 June 2026, following an updated court order to resolve the prolonged inheritance war, authorities exhumed Kafeero's remains in Nkokonjeru for conclusive bone-sample DNA testing. On 25 June 2026, the Government Forensic Laboratory released the official findings at the Uganda Police Headquarters in Naguru in the presence of security and government officials. The forensic test results revealed that out of the 25 paternity claimants, only four individuals that is, Benedicto Kafeero, Simon Peter Kafeero, Thomas Swaz Kafeero, and Elizabeth Nagawa were confirmed to be the biological children of the late musician.

== Discography ==
- Muvubuka Munnange
- Abatunda Ebyokulya
- Ekijjankunene, part III
- Temukyasaga
- Kiwenenya Amazina
- Ebintu Byomuko
- Tulera Birerya
- Walumbe Zzaaya
- Obutamatira
- Ekyali Ekintu Kyange
- Gwe Musika
- Dunia Weeraba
- Edduma Lye'mbaga
- Omwana W'omuzungu
- Baabo Bagambe
- Nantabulirirwa
- Kampala Mu Kooti
- Dipo Naziggala
- Moviour
- Bamutalira
- Olulimi Lwange
- Nsonda Nnya
- Emomboze
- Eyali Amanyi Okupanga
- Galenzi Mmwe
- Musaayi Gwange
- Lucia
- Singa Nalinze
- Bisirikirwa
- Tusuza emyoyo
- Esawa yokuzaawa
- Mwanyinaze

== See also ==
- List of African musicians
- List of Ugandan musicians
