= Mathias Walukagga =

Ugandan musician and politician

Sir Mathias Walukagga

Background information
- Born: Masaka District
- Genre: Country music
- Occupations: Musical Artist and Politician
- Years active: 1990s

Mathias Walukaga is also commonly known as Sir Mathias Mulumba Walukaga was born from Masaka who is particularly known for his prominent career in the music industry of Uganda. Walukagga is a songwriter and musician of kandongo kamu or band and local music. He grew up from the central part of Uganda who later developed an interest in music and storytelling. Kadongo Kamu is a Uganda music tradition mostly characterised by guitar-based music and songs that mainly tell stories about society and people's lives.

== Music career ==
Sir Mathias Walukaga started his music career in the 1990s who later became so prominent in the Uganda music industry in the 2000s. His first recorded album is widely reported as Amagumba which had some notable tracks such as Abataka and Amagumba. The album had four songs and was released in 1997. Therefore, Walukagga's songs often deal with poverty, morality, culture, politics among others. Some of the most recognized songs by Sir Mathias Walukaga are

- Parliament Yaffe
- Referee
- Bakoowu

Omuzadde tagulwa among others

His willingness to address controversial political and social issues through music became one of the defining features of his career. Later in 2013 he received a recognition from the Kabaka of Buganda to be titled as "Sir".

== Political career ==
Sir Mathias Walukaga later moved to active politics after a successful music career. In 2021, he contested for the mayor role of Kyengera Town council under the National Unity Platform party and won becoming into a musician-turned-local-government leader. His political ambitions later expanded to the national politics in 2025, he sought the National Unity Platform (NUP) ticket to contest for the Busiro East in 2026 Parliamentary elections. He won the party Nomination over the incumbent MP Medard Ssegona a political maverick. However the Electoral Commission later disqualified him, saying the academic documents he submitted didn't meet the required qualifications and also the High court subsequently upheld the decision.

== See also ==
- Robert Kyagulanyi Sentamu
- Geofrey Lutaaya
