= Sister Charity =

- Born: Kyobutungi Charity; 7 June 1980 (age 46); Kyangyenyi Sheema, Uganda
- Occupations: Singer/Songwriter; TV Presenter
- Television: Sisimuka (TV West)
- Spouse: Rasta Charz (m. 2003; sep. 2014)
- Children: Tibo-Ruhanga Morris (Son); Ayebazibwe Innocent (Son)
- Parents: Enoth Buriita (Father); Kobuzaare Evaster Buriita (Mother)
- Musical career
- Genres: Pop; R&B; Cultural music; Gospel music
- Years active: 2000–present
- Label: Uganda Performing Right (AFROBEATS) Society

Sister Charity (Real name Kyobutungi Charity) is a western Ugandan musician and TV personality. She presents the morning show (Sisimuka) on TV West in Mbarara, Uganda. She is popularly known for her 2001 hit song Grade. She sings mostly in her native language Runyankore and then Luganda and English. She was listed among the best artists from Western Uganda alongside Juliana Kanyomozi, Ray G, Angella Katatumba and Toniks on Hi Pipo.

== Career ==
She started singing with a group called TYE (Train the youth effort) band in 2000. Charity joined Rays Band owned by Rasta Charz, with which she performs. She has also contributed to the Am A Ugandan project by bringing its message in a song titled” Ndi Omunya Uganda” a song that she collaborated with Santana her co-presenter on TV West and also a musician.

Sister Charity has nine albums and these include Grade, Omufumbo, Pound, Choice, Nkyalimbooko, Jambuura and many others. Most of these songs are in her local language (Runyankole) minus some few which are in Luganda and English.

She has shared stage with Uganda's biggest musicians like Nicky Jizzy Dr. Jose Chameleone, Prossy Kankunda, Gravity Omutujju and many others

in 2011, Sister Charity was announced as a presenter for the morning show (Sisimuka) on Vision Group's TV West in Mbarara where she works until now.

== Personal life ==
She was born 7 June 1980 to Mr. and Mrs. Enoth Buriita in a family of 6 children and she is the second last born. She studied from Rweibaare Primary school, Rweibaare Secondary school, went to Train The youth Effort (TYE) for higher level and later joined Mbarara Business School (MBI) where she attained a UNEB Dip in Accountancy. She married her mentor Rasta Charz but divorced in 2013 citing disrespect in their relationship.

== Discography ==
- Grade
- Choice
- Nsasira
- Pound
- Nkyalimbooko
- Omufumbo
- Ekyoyine
- Zaara with Rub'een

== Awards ==
- Ever Green - Western artist of the year 2014
- PAM Awards (Pearl Of Africa Music Awards) - Best Western Artiste of the year 2005 - Grade
- Radio West Annual music festival - Best artist of the year 2004
- Radio West Annual music festival - Best artist of the year 2003
- Bell lager achiever award western region, 2003
- Radio West Annual music festival - Best artist of the year 2002
