= Kyanamukaaka =

Sub-county in Masaka district

Kyanamukaaka is a sub-county of Masaka District located in central Bukoto central bordering on Rakai District, Uganda.

It is the location of a source of the River Nabajjuzi, a recognized Ramsar site. It has four parishes: Kamuzinda, Zzimwe, Kyantale, and Buyaga. Its schools include Kkindu Vocational Primary and Secondary School, Molly and Paul Kamuzinda Primary and Secondary, Corner Stone Kitiiti Primary School, and St Charles Kyamula Primary School.

Major economic activities include pineapple, passion fruit, coffee, and vanilla growing, fishing, and livestock.
