= Papa Cidy =

Ugandan singer and music executive

- Also known as: Cidy, Papa, Midu
- Born: Hamidu Sekyeru; 8 March 1986 (age 39)
- Origin: Kampala, Uganda
- Genres: Afrobeat, Reggae, Ragga, Kidandali
- Occupations: Singer-songwriter, costume designer
- Instrument: Vocals
- Years active: 2009–present
- Labels: Leone Island Records

Papa Cidy (born Hamidu Sekyeru, 8 March 1986) is a Ugandan singer and music executive. Papa Cidy sings in Luganda, English and Swahili. He is vice president of Ugandan music label Leone Island.

Papa Cidy himself says "I'm ready to entertain whatever is on planet earth".

== Musical career ==
Papa Cidy joined Leone Island as a costume designer in 2009. He had previously recorded a single title "Tolina Kisa". When label president Jose Chameleone heard those vocals, he decided Cidy's talents were being wasted as a tailor. Cidy and Chameleone recorded a song together that proved to be Papa Cidy's big break. The pair has since released other duets, including "Joselina", "Daniella", "Meeme Katale" and "Nishike Mukononi".

Apart from his collaborations with Chameleone, Cidy has released such singles as "Your Name", "Ba Mugumu", "Fuse", "Akazinga" and "Noonya". One of his hits from 2012, "Evalina" is not only the title of his first album, but also nominated in the Global Rockstar contest 2014.

In August 2014 Cidy put together his first album, Evalina, which is now available on iTunes and Spotify. Shortly after releasing the album he made two single follow ups. "Daniella" feat Jose Chameleone and "Nkubira" feat MC Norman, both on iTunes and Spotify. In October, Cidy put together the rest of his songs and created another album called Nkwata, and is also the name of the first song. "Nkwata" is the first version of the song "Nishike Mukononi", but was remixed and featured by Jose Chameleone in 2014 and then also name changed.

In 2022, Papa Cidy joined Sage Music, an Australian based artist management service. The African branch of Sage is based in Kigali, Rwanda and looks after a variety of East African artist. Under this new management, the world will start to see Papa Cidy in a new light and reach platforms and audiences he has not reached before. Papa Cidy released a new single with Spice Diana, Nze Wuwo on 15th of April, 2022.

== Clothing ==
Papa Cidy is not only known for making big hits but he also has a clothing line called "BAKNA" which makes apparel for celebrities. He recently made a shirt from the Uganda flag to celebrate Uganda's independence. This shirt became popular when Jose Chameleone dressed it at the Uganda comedy store on the 21 September 2019.
