= CBS FM Buganda =

Ugandan radio channel

CBS FM [Central Broadcasting Service] Buganda
Kampala; Uganda
- Frequencies: 88.8 & 89.2 megahertz

Programming
- Format: News and information

Ownership
- Owner: Buganda Kingdom
- Sister stations: 89.2 Fm Emmanduso

History
- First air date: 22 June 1996

Links
- Website: www.cbsfm.ug

CBS FM Buganda is a Luganda radio station in Kampala, Uganda.

== Enkuuka Y'Omwaka ==
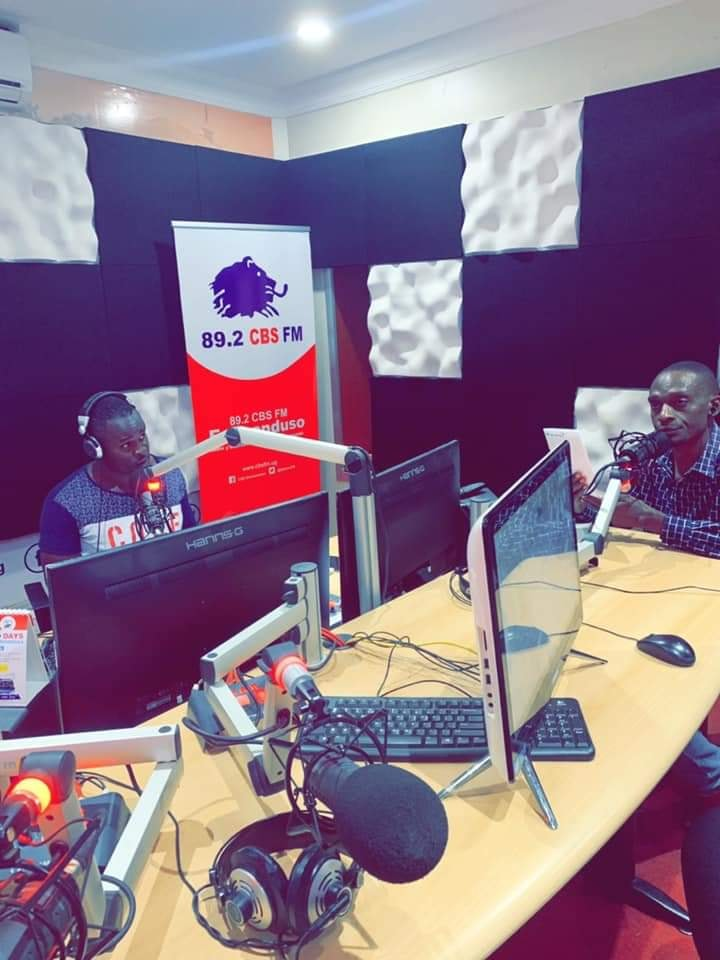
studios

Is an end of year fete organised by CBS FM, on New Year's Eve. Enkuka yo Mwaka crowns winners of the six-month-long Omuzira wa Bazira (hero of heroes) quiz competition which tests knowledge of Buganda kingdom culture. It brings together some of Buganda's finest musicians. It is essentially entertainment, merry-making and full blast fun before the king officially ushers his subjects into the new year with a symbolic key. Rather than join urban Uganda's elite in high end hotels, the Kabaka comes to watch the fireworks and performances with his people, a gesture that is interpreted by many as a show of humility and connection with the masses, and the reason mammoth crowds attend the Lubiri event.

== Entanda ya buganda ==
Entanda ya Buganda is a radio quiz programme which aims at promoting Buganda culture and norms. The competition that tests participants on a wide range of issues from and within Buganda, including idioms and mastery of Luganda, culture, sports, politics, among others, attracts more than 500 participants. The winner of the competition is always crowned on 31 December during a function presided over by the Kabaka at his Mengo palace. Winners walk home with land titles and cash prizes. Mukiibi explains, "We also introduced entanda ya masomero in schools which the Nnabagereka's office facilitates. Certainly as Buganda we treasure it, we want our people to be proud of and master Luganda and our culture in general. We believe in the power of these events to sustain our culture and kingdom.". All previous winners have received land on which they have built schools and other development ventures.

== Closure and reopening ==
On 10 September 2009, CBS was taken off air for inciting violence among the public. This followed the numerous talk shows on the radio that hosted people who were critical of the government. Matters worsened when the Kabaka was blocked from travelling to Kayunga which led to riots. The technicians would switch on the studio equipment, hoping CBS would be switched back on; with time, they stopped opening the studio. Occasionally, the CBS staff stopped by at the station to catch up, laugh at their misfortune and even share the little money they had. Most activities of the station were canceled including the public events and publications. In 2010, the station was reopened, after one year of closure.
