= Kadongo Kamu =

Uganda's Oldest Music genre

- Stylistic origins: Baganda Music
- Cultural origins: Mid 1860s, Kampala Uganda
- Typical instruments: Bass guitar, Vocals

Kadongo Kamu is a music genre native to Uganda and is the oldest mainstream music genre in the country. The word "kadongo kamu" is a term in the Ganda language that means "one little guitar".

Kadongo kamu occupies a unique position in Ugandan Cultural history as both musical form and a storytelling tradition, bridging oral literature and modern popular music. Its yrics often address social issues, politics, love, morality and everyday life making it powerful medium for public commentary and cultural expression.

== History ==
Kadongo Kamu emerged from traditional Baganda music and oral storytelling practices, drawing influences from folk songs and drumming styles such as Bakisimba. Although its roots are linked to earlier musical traditions, the genre gained prominence in the mid 20th century particularly from the 1950s and 1960s when the acoustic guitars became more accessible and widely adopted in East Africa.

Perhaps the first well-known artist of the genre was Fred Masagazi in the 60's. Masagazi is considered by many to be the father of kadongo kamu. His brand of educative singing won him many fans and he was one of the few musicians who was involved with Uganda's independence in 1962. Elly Wamala was another of the founders. Elly Wamala is credited with the invention of this genre but abandoned it because it was constantly and easily played informally by people he considered uneducated. It is common to find kadongo kamu artists staged on the streets of Kampala (Uganda's Capital City) entertaining a micro concert for a small fee usually raised by the crowd. The grandfather of this genre though is widely regarded to be Christopher Ssebaduka who last performed in 1996. Fred Masagazi and Eclas Kawalya are credited for having popularized it by actively recording in this genre in the 1960s and early 1970s. They were followed by a number of musicians who stayed true to the style and sound of the music. In the mid to late 1970s, during the dark days of Idi Amin, this genre was kept alive by Peterson Mutebi. Although many song themes revolve around suffering and outrage, the original artists of this genre sang about love and often praised women in recordings that hardly exceeded three and a half minutes. Herman Basudde was a very popular kadongo kamu musician in the 80's and 90's.

Dan Mugula is one of the few surviving pioneers of the genre. Fred Sebatta and Paulo Kafeero made their mark in the 90's. Over the past decade, there have been other musicians, but they have been overshadowed by pop musicians in the new bustling pop music scene. Today, the genre is still marginalized, but the music is loved by cultural loyalists in the Buganda region, as can be seen with current musicians like Fred Sebaale and Mathias Walukagga, who are still enjoying music success.

== Growth and popularity (1960s-1980s) ==
During the post-independence period, Kadongo Kamu expanded through radio broadcasts and live performances. Artists used songs to narrate stories and comment on social and political realities, turning the genre into a form of musical journalism and moral instruction.

== Storytelling and musical characteristics ==
Kadongo Kamu is distinguished by its narrative structure and emphasis on storytelling rather than dance rhythms. Songs often unfold like spoken narratives, sometimes without repetitive choruses allowing artists to explore complex themes and moral lessons.

Musically, the genre traditionally features;

- Acoustic guitar accompaniment.
- Vocals in Luganda.
- Minimal instruments and simple rhythmic patterns that foreground lyrics.

Thematically, Kadongo Kamu songs explore love, family life, social injustices, political satire, religion and community values.

== Cultural influence and legacy ==
Kadongo Kamu has had lasting impact on Uganda's musical landscape. It laid the foundation for many later popular genres ad continues to influence contemporary Ugandan music through its emphasis on narrative depth and social commentary.

The genre serves as a repository of cultural memory, preserving Baganda values, language and oral traditions within modern musical forms. Its storytelling approach has influenced other Ugandan genres including Band music and pop styles that integrate narrative lyrics and social themes.

== See also ==
- Baganda Music
- Music of Uganda

== Notable musicians ==
Paulo Kafeero

Herman Basudde
