= Iryn Namubiru =

Ugandan singer and songwriter (born 1981)

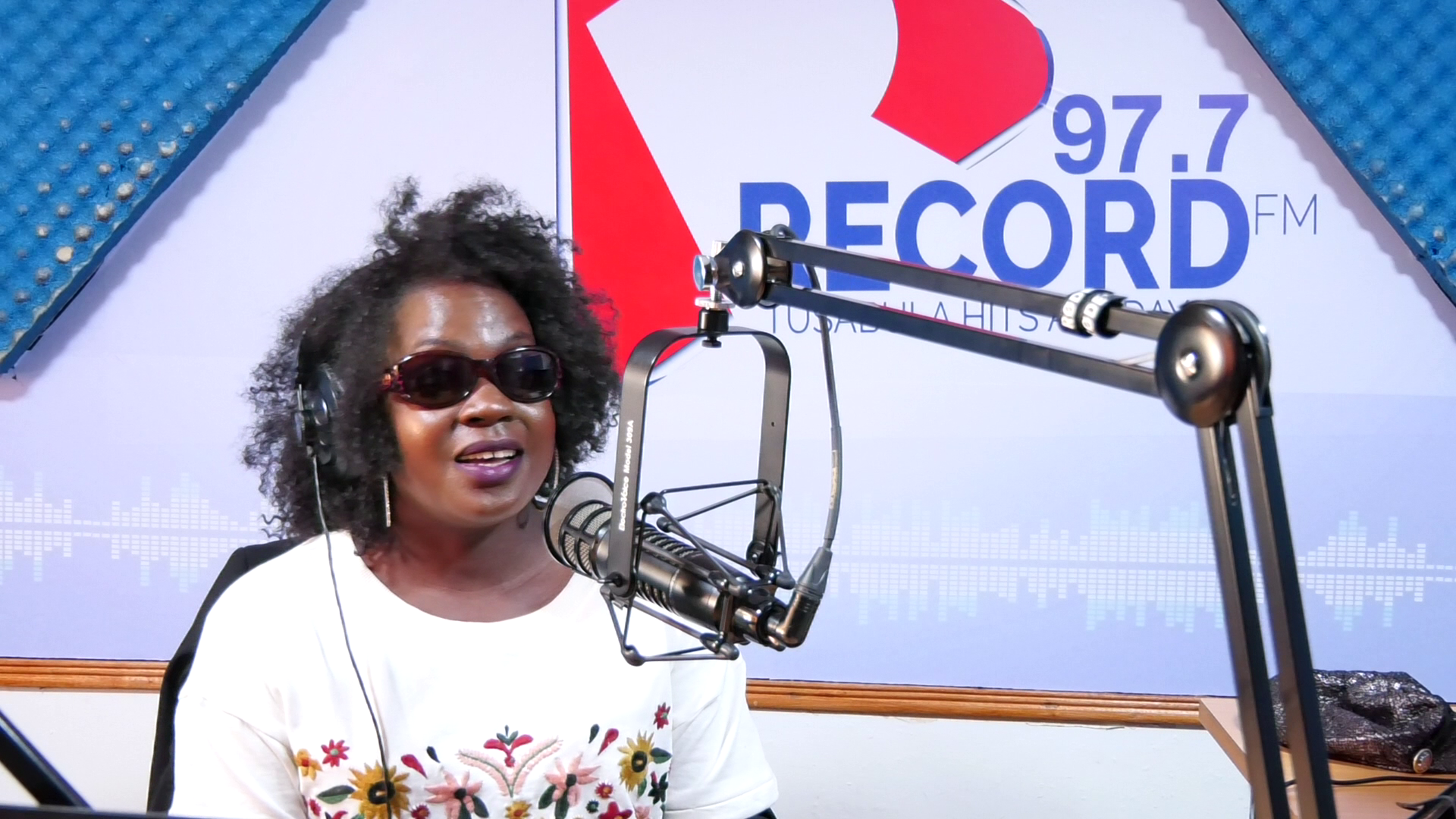
- Iryn Namubiru At 97.7 Record FM
- Born: 13 December 1981 (age 44); Uganda
- Education: General education Namasagali College, Namasagali, Uganda; University; Stendhal University; Grenoble, France
- Occupations: Musician & entertainer
- Musical career
- Genres: Pop; R&B; jazz; world; reggae; blues; classical music; Afrobeat
- Years active: 1995–present
- Labels: Bloom Records, Nujeli, Grajoh UK

Irene Gladys Namubiru, also known as Iryn Namubiru (born 13 December 1981), is a Ugandan singer and songwriter.

== Background ==
Namubiru was born in the Central Region of Uganda and received an education at the following institutions:

- Bugema Adventist Senior Secondary School in Luweero District
- Namasagali College in Kamuli District
- Airways Tourism & Hotel Institute
- Stendhal University in Grenoble, France
- Cavendish University, Uganda

== Music career ==
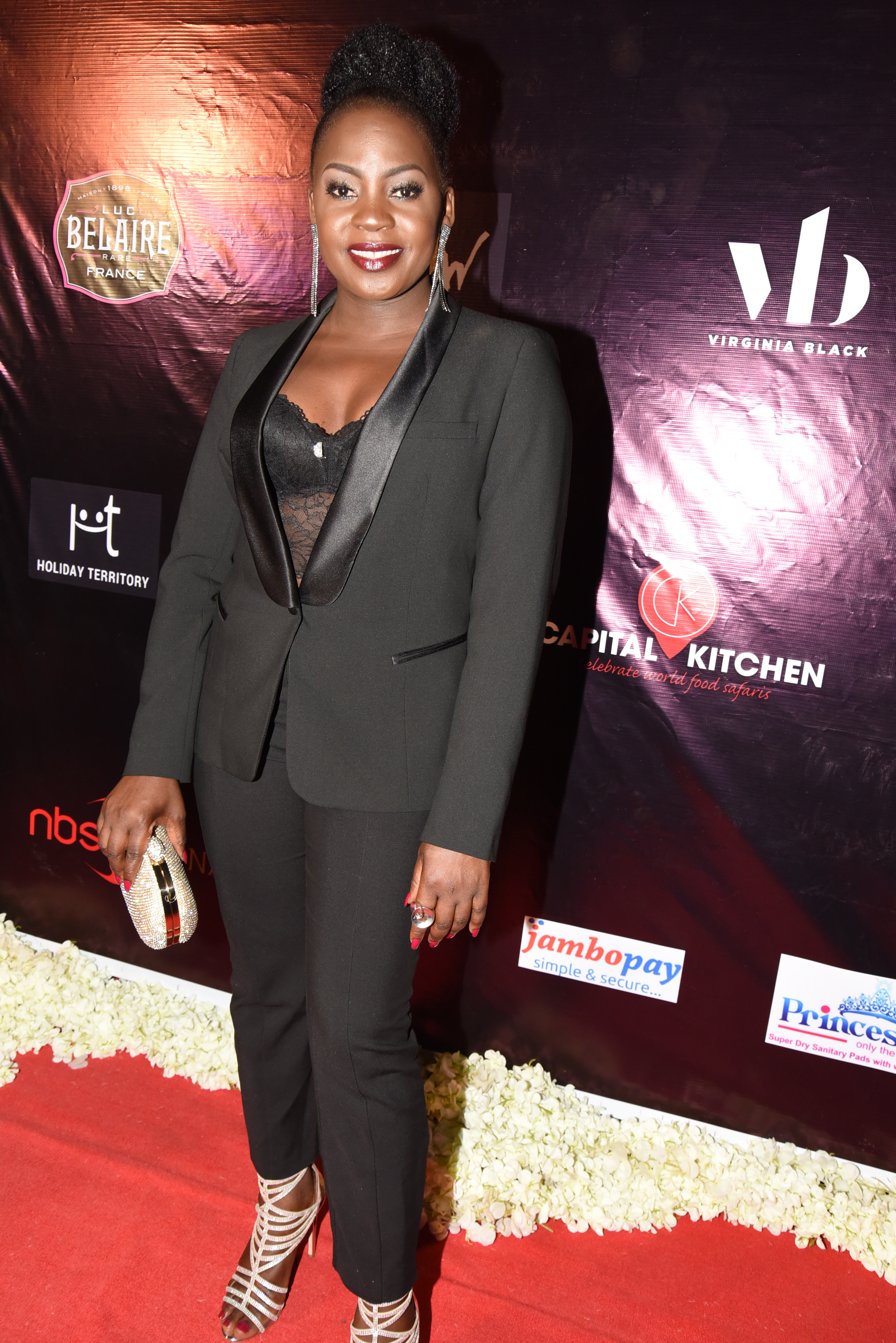
Iryn Namubiru

According to Namubiru, she had a passion for singing since her childhood and strove to make it a bigger part of her life. Her first attempt at success in the music industry came in 1995, when she joined singers-cum-rapper DJs Ragga Dee and Molar-Messe, as the group Da Hommies, and "Joss Jjew" Mawejje as a studio arranger/keyboardist, assisting in the release of a series of singles including "Bamusakata", "Mukwano", and "Mukyala tokaba" in early 1995. Her first individual single, "Learn to say good bye", also appeared on the group's subsequent album. Soon afterwards, she had her first stage appearance in September 1995.

In 1999, she joined Kanyomozi, her former schoolmate at Namasagali College, to form the R&B all-girl group called I-Jay. In 2000, they released their first 7 track album titled "WAIT" which included songs "Wait RMX (Ft Steve Jean)", "Not Good Enough", "Mwana", "Wait", "Emirimu", "Vivi LA Vi" and "Two To Make It True...", which received moderate air play on radio stations in Uganda.

Soon after the release of their record, Namubiru left for France and the group disbanded. This break up led to speculation that the two separated on unfriendly terms however, they both denied such rumours. While in France, she formed the Afro-Soul group Nujeli with Julien Grout, and they released the ENSI LP.

In 2006, Namubiru collaborated with singer Bebe Cool on the songs "Simbalala" and "Lwaki Onzannyilako?"

However, Namubiru did not achieve widespread success until 2006, when she released her album Nkuweeki? Since 2006, Namubiru has released the songs "Y'ono", "Lwaki", "Bonna Obasinga", "Begombeko", "Birowoozo", for which she has received various awards in the Ugandan music industry. In 2011, Namubiru won in four categories of the 2011 Pearl of Africa Music Awards (PAM). She won in the categories of Artist of the Year, Female Artist of the Year, Album of the Year and Best RnB Single of the Year.

== Controversies ==
Namubiru has been criticised by her detractors for dressing "inappropriately" in her music videos and, at times, her concerts. According to her critics, her costumes oppose traditional Ugandan dressing customs and set a bad example for other aspiring musicians. In 2009, her video for "Bonna Obasinga" was criticised due to a swimming costume she wore. Namubiru later shot another music video for the song to placate her critics. However, many of her fans have defended her "creative" attire and perceive the accusations to be socially regressive and resistant to new styles.

On 3 May 2013, Namubiru was arrested in Tokyo, Japan for alleged possession of illegal drugs. She had traveled to Japan to perform at a music concert but she was arrested at Tokyo's Narita International Airport before her performance. One week prior to the arrest, Namubiru was tweeting about her excitement to be performing in Japan. The concert was to take place at the Yotsukaido Cultural Hall in Tokyo, Japan's capital. Namubiru was found carrying ecstasy (3,4-methylenedioxy-N-methylamphetamine), which was concealed in her luggage. She was transferred from the Tokyo airport detention facility to a police station in Central Tokyo, where she recorded a statement in connection to the illegal possession of MDMA, which is commonly known as "ecstasy"; she denied any knowledge of the drug. On 24 May 2013, at a hearing in Japan, the court found Namubiru to be innocent. Police in Japan cleared her of the drug trafficking charges and released her.

== Personal life ==
Namubiru was married to Frank Galusy Morel, a Frenchman, and together they have two sons. She is fluent in English, French, and Luganda, which is her native language. She lives with her family in France, and most of her music fans reside in Uganda.

Namubiru is the founder and chief executive officer of a non-government organisation called Gather for Children based in Mityana - Central Region, which she formed in 2006 to help empower and support women / care takers, young mothers and teenage mothers to care and educate their children and vulnerable children. The organisation operates on Namubirus's seven acres of land.

On 24 November 2018, she survived an accident in Lake Victoria, in which a cruise boat carrying party revellers capsized, killing 33 people.

== Awards and nominations ==
=== Awards ===
- Best Female Artist and Best R&B song, PAM Awards 2006
- Best Female artist, Buzz magazine 2007
- Best Collaboration, Diva Awards 2009
- Best Female Artist, Pam Awards 2010
- Best Afro Single, Diva Awards 2010
- Artist of the Year, Diva Awards 2010
- Artist of the Year, Pam Awards 2011
- Best female Artist, Pam Awards 2011
- Best RnB Song, Pam Awards 2011
- Best Album, Pam Awards 2011
- Collaboration with "Happy Science" Japan on two songs, 2012

=== Nominations ===
- 2013 HiPipo Music Awards - Best Band Song, "Ndeyreya"
