= Bakisimba =

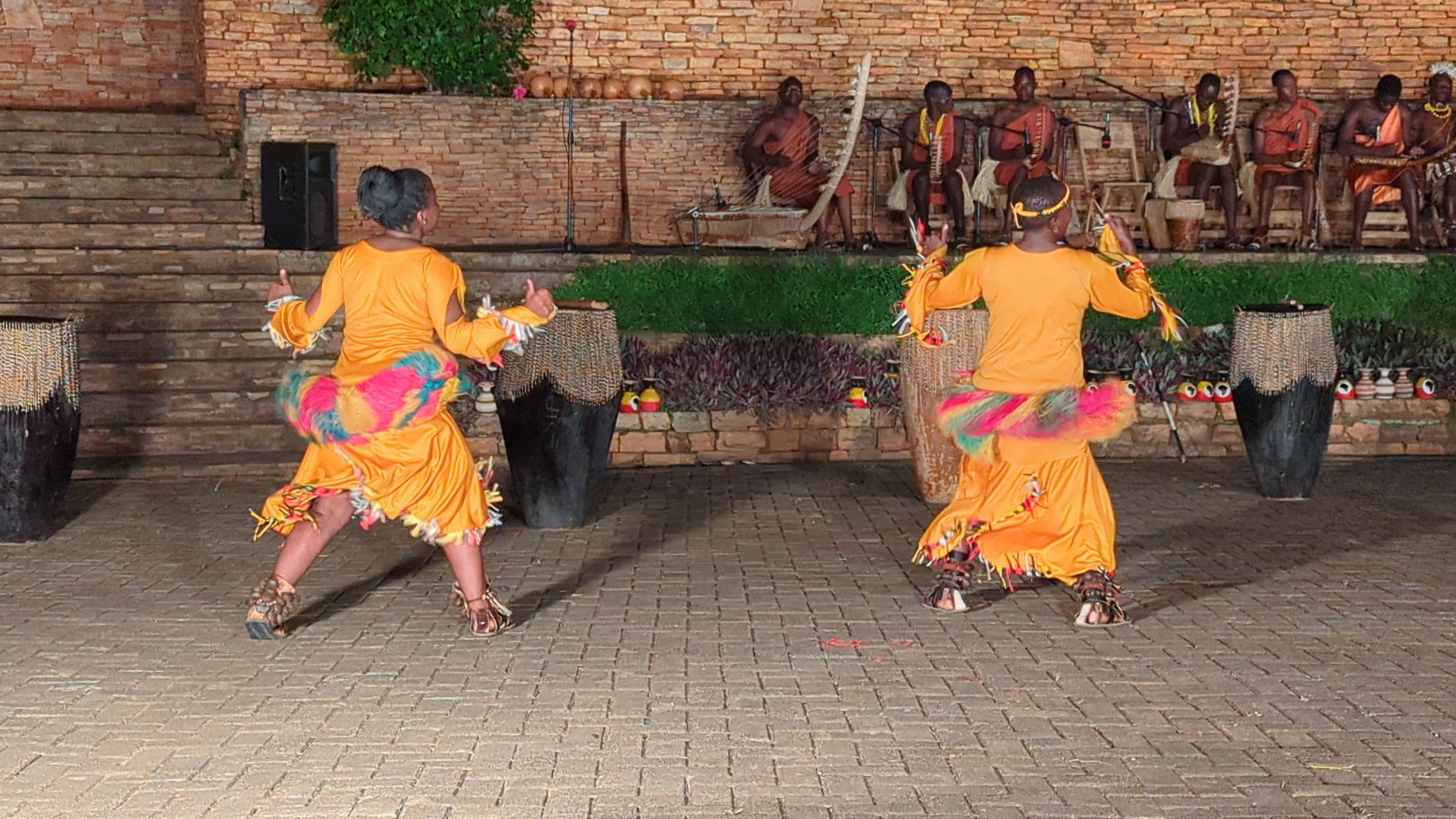
Bakisimba Traditional Dance

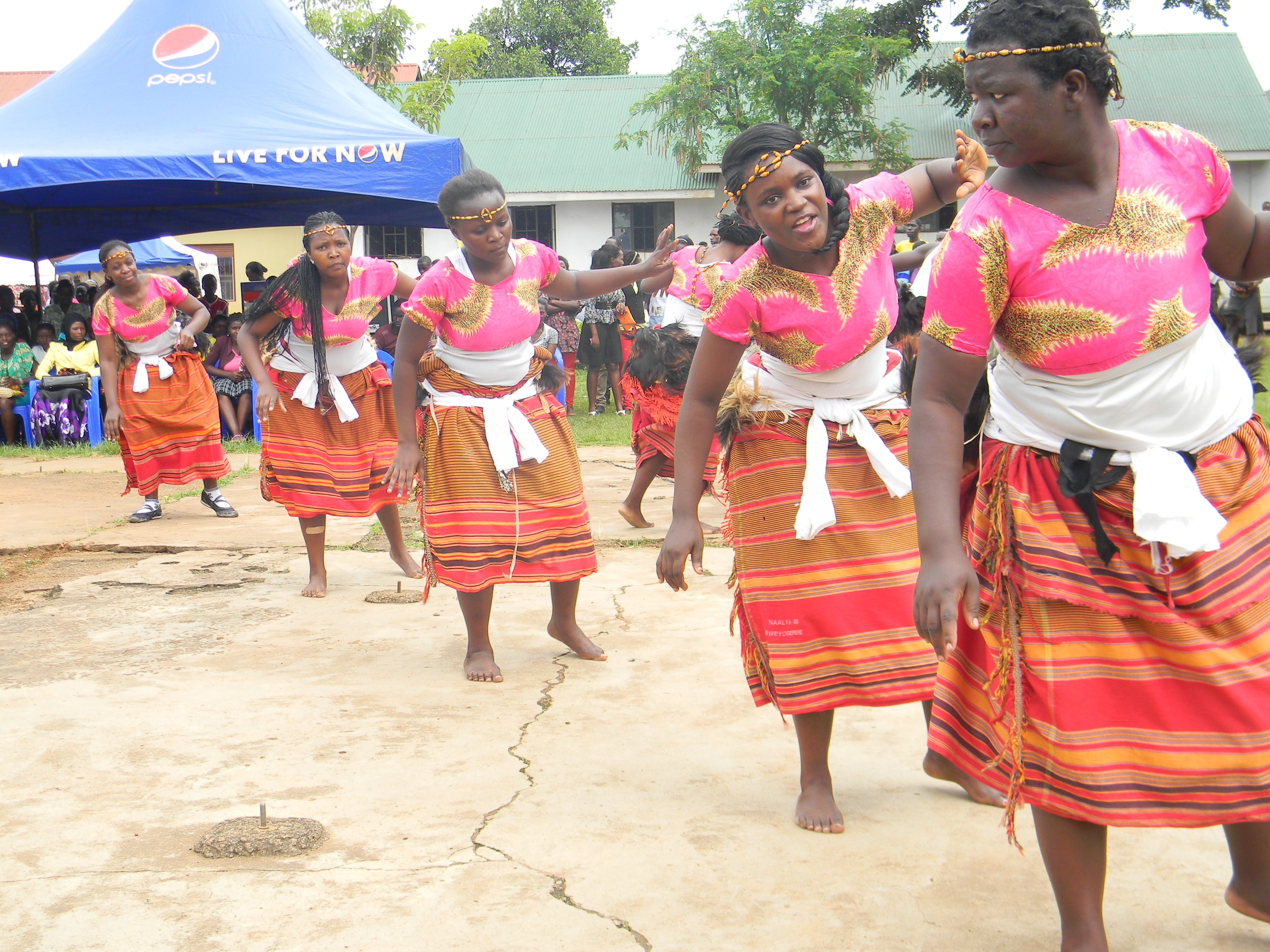
Muwogola kiganda dance

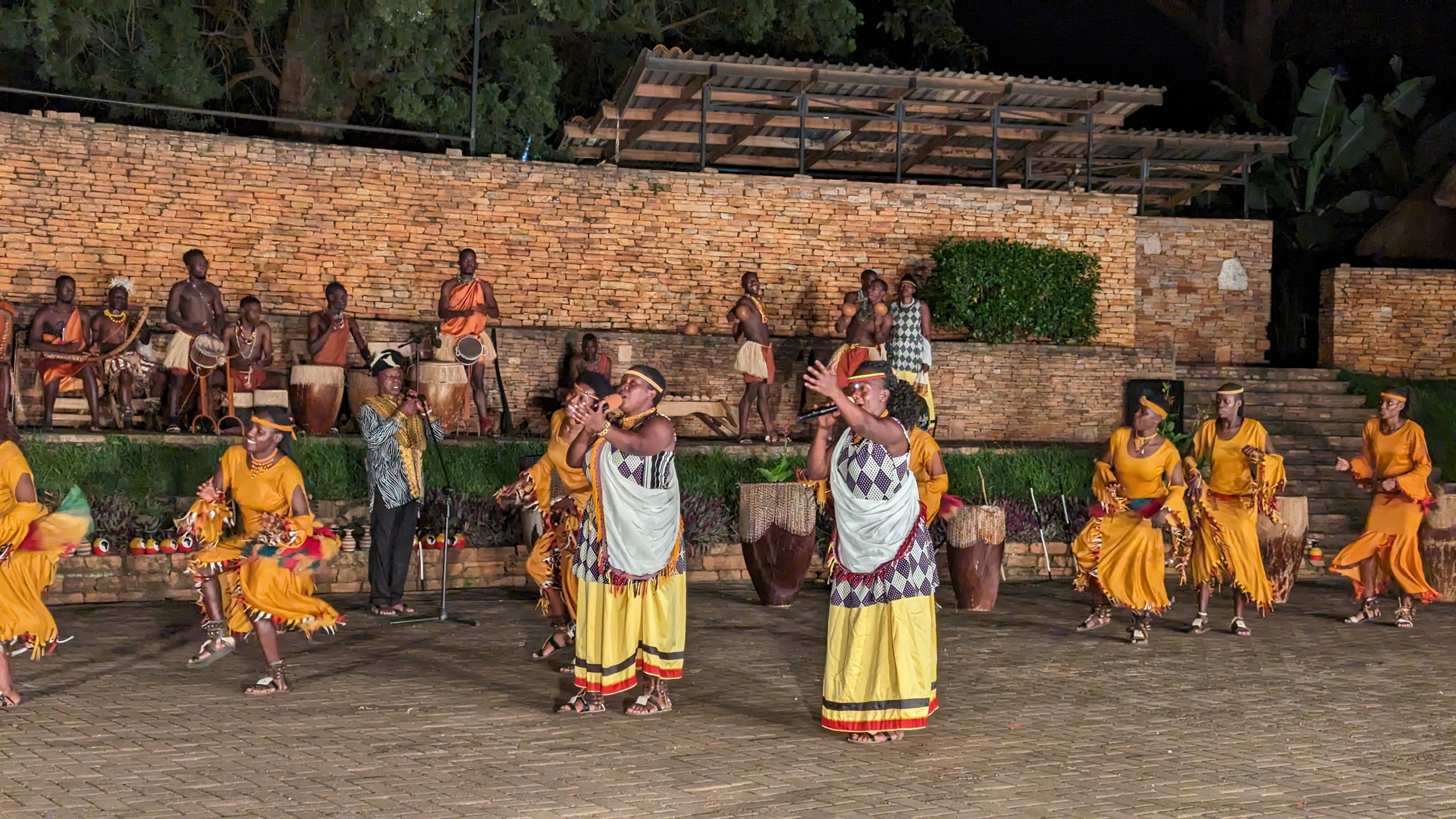
Bakisimba

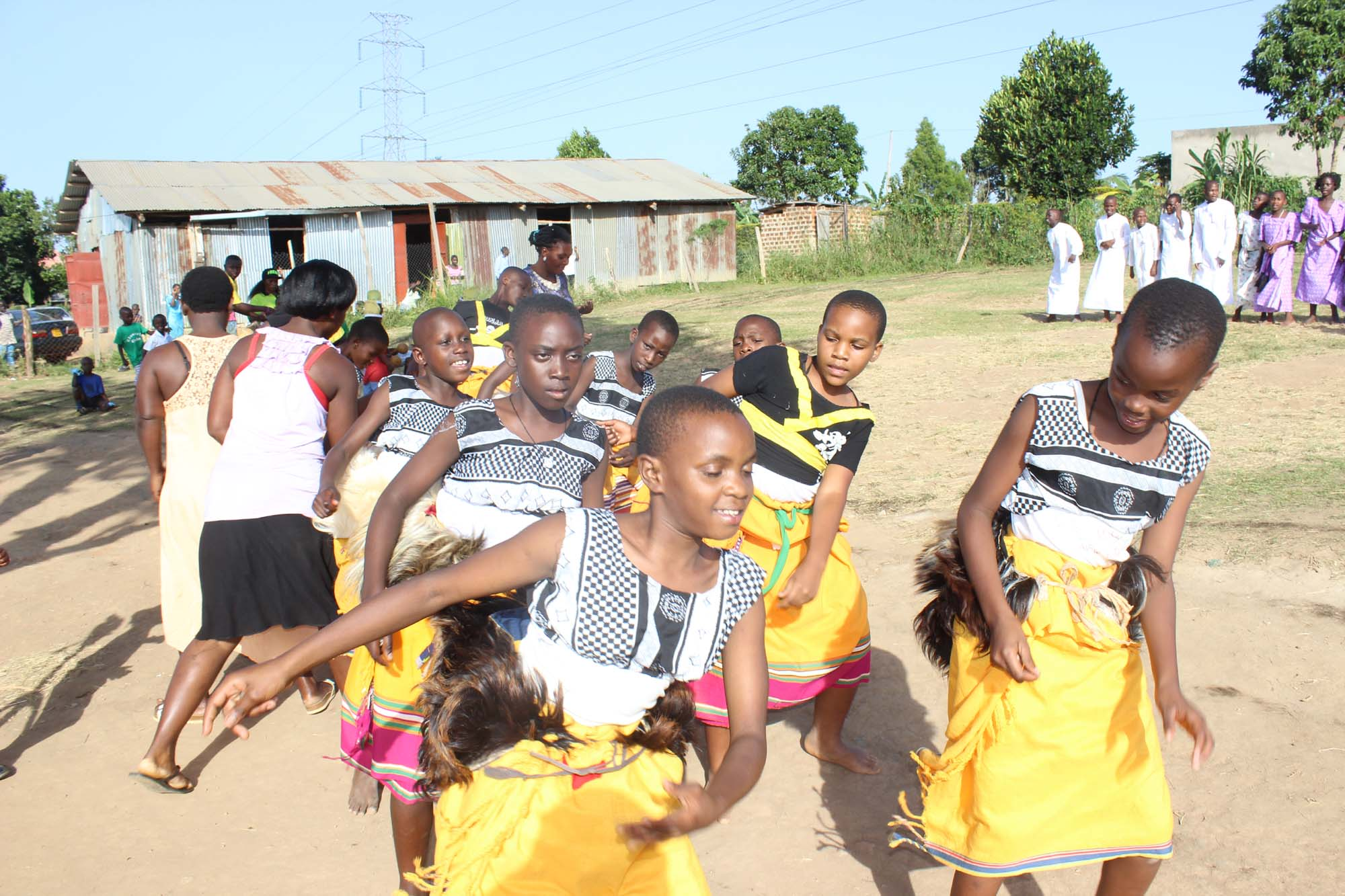
Children performing Muwogola dance on a ceremony

Bakisimba dance (Baakisiimba) also known as Nankasa or Muwogola is a traditional dance form originating from the Baganda people of Buganda Kingdom in Central Uganda. It is believed to have originated from the movements of a drunken King Ssuuna of Buganda Kingdom. The dance was initially performed in the Buganda Royal Court in ancient times an it holds significant cultural and social importance within the community and is often performed during tribal ceremonies, celebrations, and festive occasions.

== History ==
The origins of Bakisimba Dance can be traced back centuries ago, and its roots are deeply embedded in the traditions of the Baganda people. The dance has been an integral part of the Baganda culture for centuries. It is one of the most common and most performed traditional dances in Uganda. The dance is believed to have originated from the movements of a drunken King Ssuuna of Buganda Kingdom. It was initially a Buganda Royal Court dance in the ancient days and it is believed that the dance was initially performed to honor the spirits and ancestors, seeking their blessings and protection. Over time, it has evolved to become a symbol of unity, pride, and cultural preservation.

== Traditional steps and movements ==
Bakisimba Dance is characterized by vigorous movements, rhythmic patterns, and energetic footwork performed by both men and women. The dancers typically form a circle, with individual performers taking turns to showcase their skills while the rest clap, sing, and provide musical accompaniment. The dance incorporates various hand gestures, jumps, stomps, and hip movements, creating a dynamic and visually captivating performance accompanied by a variety of instruments such as gourd rattles (Nseege), trumpets of cow horns (engoombe), Ngalabi and different drums such as Mpuunyi, Nankasa and Mbuut.

== Significance and cultural value ==
Bakisimba Dance holds immense cultural value within the Baganda community. It serves as a means of storytelling, expressing emotions, and celebrating important milestones in the lives of individuals or the community as a whole. The dance embodies the spirit of togetherness, promoting harmony, and reinforcing the bond between generations. It also serves as a source of identity, allowing members of the community to connect with their heritage and preserve their cultural traditions.

== Influence ==
The Bakisimba dance is an important part of the Baganda culture. It is performed on several occasions such as weddings, coronations, and other cultural events. The dance is also used to celebrate the harvest season. The dance is believed to bring good luck and prosperity to the community. In recent years, the Bakisimba Dance has gained popularity beyond the Baganda community and has become a significant part of Uganda's cultural landscape. It is often performed at national events, international festivals, and showcases, representing the country's diverse cultural heritage. The dance has also inspired contemporary artists, who incorporate elements of Bakisimba into their music and performances, further spreading its influence.
