= Ray G =

Ugandan musician

Ray G Rhiganz
- Born: Reagan Muhairwe; 12 June 1992 (age 34); Ishaka Bushenyi, Uganda
- Education: Ishaka Adventist College
- Occupations: Singer, songwriter
- Known for: Music
- Notable work: Forever, Omusheshe (with Spice Diana)
- Spouse: Annabelle Twinomugisha
- Children: S.H.O (Daughter)
- Musical career
- Genres: R&B, Zouk Ragga
- Instruments: Acoustic guitar
- Years active: 2012–present
- Label: Awesome Entertainment

Reagan Muhairwe (born 12 June 1992), commonly known as Ray G Rhiganz, is a Ugandan singer and songwriter. He mainly sings heritage music in Runyankore. He started singing in 2009 while at school until 2014 when he broke through with his hit song "Amarari".

Ray has shared big stages with international artists like Eddy Kenzo, Meddy and Jose Chameleone on the Johnnie Walker Highball tour in Mbarara. He is among Allan Toniks, Sister Charity, Juliana Kanyomozi who comes from Western Uganda. He has also collaborated with music heavy weights like Bebe Cool, Voltage music, Spice Diana, Serena Bata, Levixone, Truth 256.

He attended Ishaka Adventist College, for both his Uganda Certificate of Education and Uganda Advanced Certificate of Education which he completed in 2012 before breaking onto the music scene. He never joined university due to his parents' failure to afford paying university tuition since he had a lot of siblings to attend school. He broke through to East African recognition after collaborating with Spice Diana on Omusheshe Song.

At his celebration which was for 10 years in the music industry, he broke a record of staging a highly attended concert in Western Uganda after it was successfully held on 14 September 2019 in Mbarara City. This pulled a lot of popular companies, like 91.3 Capital FM, Africell Uganda, 91.2 Crooze Fm and NBS Television.

In 2021, Ray G won an award of the best years act from Western Uganda, an award by New Janzi Awards, an award aimed at awarding Ugandan musicians in the creative art industry.

After the serious outbreak of COVID-19 pandemic, he appeared on the many raised voices that intended to sensitize the community about the deadly virus. This was done through the song he featured on Bebe Cool, Catherine Kusasira, titled Corona Distance.

In 2021, he was allegedly accused and dragged to court on account of breach of the performing contract, where Ray and his then manager Clifford had received USh 2 million to perform at a wedding party in Ibanda District and later had refused to repay.

In October 2022, he staged his first ever music concert at Imperial Royale Hotel in Kampala, the capital of Uganda. He is a member of the Anglican Church of Uganda.

== Marriage life ==
Ray G and Liz started dating in 2016 when Liz was working in Dubai. During that period, she allegedly started funding some of his music, rented their house and bought some house-hold items after Ray G had convinced her mum that he would marry Liz. She started sending him money to buy a plot of land to farm a banana plantation and cows.

In 2019, Ray G told Liz that after his concert, he would wed her though she had suffered two miscarriages.

Since Annabell was a friend to Liz as she used to visit them numerous times at their home. It was at that period when Ray g and Annabell came closer secretly and suddenly got her pregnant, which forced Ray G to introduce and wed her since she had refused to abort.

Liz was shocked, embarrassed, suffered mental breakdown and started drinking heavily. Later she went back to Dubai; however, she claims never to forgive Ray G.

In 2021 he officially wedded TV Presenter Annabelle Twinomugisha. Towards the end of year, both tied a knot which was attended by his longtime friend and gospel artist Levixone who worked as a best man, and the ceremony was led by Bishop Sheldon Mwesigwa. He and his wife lost their newly second born and a daughter, Kim. This moment saw Ray G's ex-girlfriend Namara excited insisting that Ray would continue paying for her wasted time and money, but was heavily publicly condemned by music lovers.

== Awards ==
- Best Western Act - Weeshe, Hipipo Music Awards.
- Best written of the year- Omusheshe, Hipipo Music Awards 2020.
- Outstanding Western Region artist - Janzi Music Awards.

== Discography ==
1. Nobanza
2. Yoya ft Levixone
3. All I can give
4. Rukundo ft Serena Bata - 2021
5. Make a Way - 2021
6. Yele ft Geosteady - 2019
7. Omusheshe featuring Spice Diana- 2019
8. Eizooba - 2020
9. Winner ft Mc Kacheche - 2020
10. Weeshe - 2019
11. Owangye Omwigarire - 2016
12. Nuunu - 2017
13. Mureebe - 2014
14. Enshazi - 2012
15. Nokigambahoki - 2015
16. Ninkukunda - 2018
17. Nkaronda (Lovely Nancy) - 2018
18. Tibyempaka - 2018
19. Ringaaniza - 2020
20. Humuura - 2020
21. Naaba Nkwine - 2017
22. Amarari - 2012
23. Tayari - 2018
24. Weena - 2019
25. Ebindikwenda- 2013
26. Weekend - 2013
27. Hiihi my Love - 2018
28. Rukundo Nenyiga - 2014
29. Yaabare
30. Amarari - 2012
31. Ow'eishe - 2025
32. Iwe featuring Pretty Banks - 2026
33. Nonteera (onkuba) featuring Fefe Bussi - 2026

== See also ==
- Spice Diana
- Sister Charity
