= Kampala YMCA =

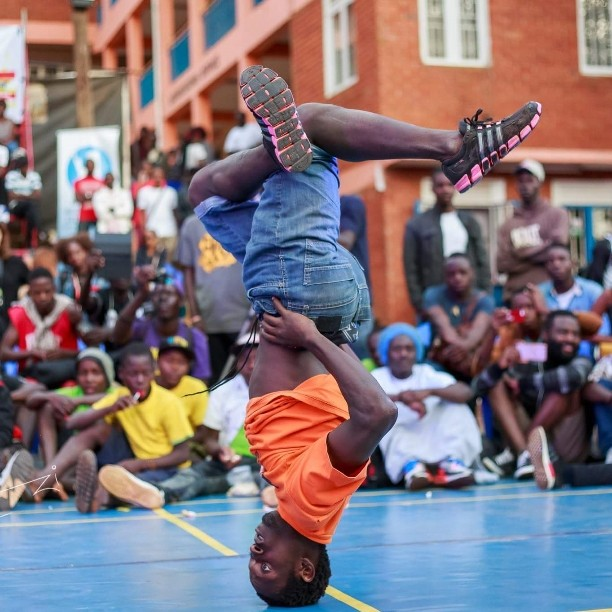
Boy sketches on the music beat at YMCA

The Kampala YMCA is located in Wandegeya, Kampala, Uganda. The building dates from 1962, and houses the non-denominational YMCA Comprehensive Institute, for vocational training. The basement is the Kampala Music School, independent of the YMCA, which trains for ABRSM examinations. A new Educational Complex, next to the original building, is part of the institute.

It is affiliated to the Uganda YMCA, which also has branches in Jinja, Mukono, Mbale, Mbarara, Kasese.

The organisation divides as Education, Programme (leisure clubs and Gala), Gender (AIDS awareness etc.), and Administration. The Education side covers

- Marketing
- Business management
- Accountancy
- Tourism
- Nursery teaching
- Catering
- Tailoring and designing
- Ugandan business certificate
- Secretarial
- Computer studies
- Clearing and forwarding
- Counselling
- Business administration
- Cosmetology

The grounds also include a nursery school, administered as part of the institute, and sports facilities.
