= Ragga Dee =

Ugandan Music Artist

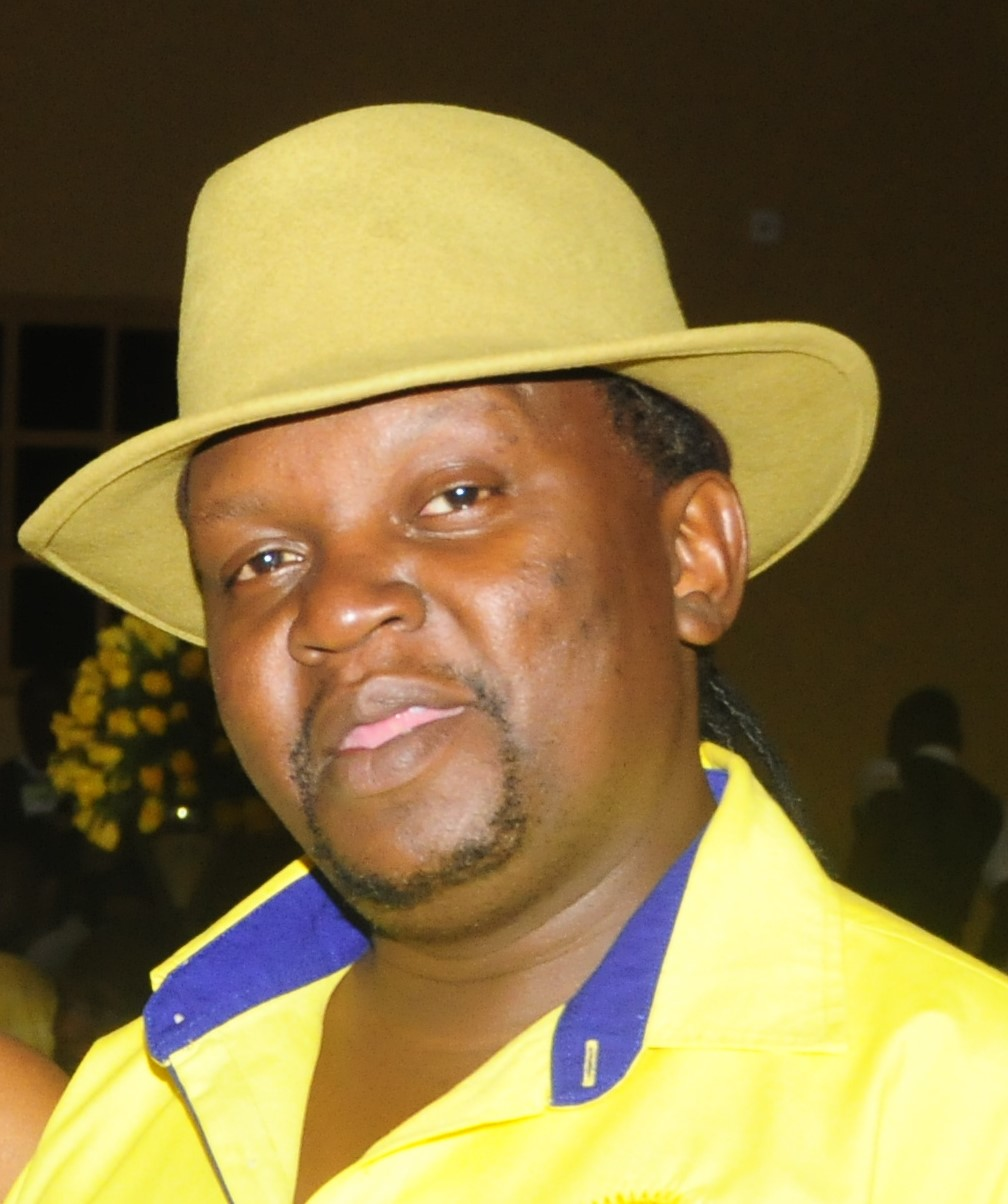

Background information
- Born: Daniel Kazibwe; 1968 (age 57–58); Uganda
- Occupations: Musician, businessman, politician
- Years active: since 1988

Ragga Dee, born Daniel Kazibwe, is a Ugandan musician and politician. He contested for mayor of Kampala in the 2016 general elections. Currently, Ragga Dee serves as An Arts Administrator representing Art on the Private Sector Foundation Executive as well as Being Chairman National Culture Forum.

== Early life and music ==
Dee was born in 1968 to George William Kyeyune. He started his music career in 1988. His music is a combination of do reggae, ragga, hip-hop, and Lingala. He was Ragga Artist of the Year at the Pearl of Africa Music Awards in 2004 and 2005 and won best video in 2006. He has 18 albums. He gained fame in the early 1990s with hits like Bamusakata and Mukwano while part of a group called Da Hommies.

He has won the Pearl of Africa Music Award for best Ragga artiste of the year as well as the Best Male Artist of the year and was profiled on BBC. In 2005 his reggae Album was crowned the Best Album at the Golden Awards in Uganda.

== Political career ==
In the build up of the 2016 Ugandan General Elections, Ragga Dee announced that he would run for the mayorship position in the Ugandan Capital of Kampala. He went ahead and joined the NRM party through which he contested in an election that he lost to the incumbent lawyer and politician Erias Lukwago.

== Songs ==
- Ndigida
- Parliament
- No. 9
- Cissy
- Kabonge Kko
- Stranger
- Letter O
- Mbawe
- Oyagala Cash
- Monomonomove
- Mundongo
- Owakaze Ke
- Champion
- Wololo
- Mukyala Jump Around
- Empeta
- Bamusakata (with Da Hommies)
- Nakakawa
- Yesu
- Amina
- Balaru
- Ogenze

== See also ==
- Iryn Namubiru
- Emperor Orlandoh
