= Lyrical G =

Jeff Kintu, better known by his stage name Lyrical G, is a Ugandan rapper, songwriter, record producer, and vocalist. In 2016, he was named among MTV Base's best hip hop artistes from Uganda.

His accolades include the Lifetime Achievement Award at the 4th edition of the MTN UG Hiphop Awards 2020, also bagging Lyricist Of The Year(2022), and 4 Pearl of Africa Music (PAM) Awards including Best Hiphop Artiste Of The Year (2005 & 2006) PAM awards.

== Early life and education ==
Lyrical G was born on 8 March 1978. He went to Nakasero Primary School and Budo Junior School for his primary education. He proceeded to St Charles Lwanga SS Kasasa and Katikamu SDA for his secondary education. He later enrolled in Nkumba University where he graduated, having majored in Business Studies.

== Music ==
Lyrical G started his rap career in the 1990s in his high school days, performing at various music concerts. He released his first single "Ato’oba" with his former group Bataka Underground in March 1999 and that same year the group went on to release their second single "Ssesetula", which was launched on Power FM. He performed with Bataka Underground until he, together with young brother AKay47 and friends, formed Urban Thugz (which later became Urban Life) in 2000. He recorded his first single "Nothing Compares" with Urban Life in 2001 after winning a recording deal for best new artiste/group at the Sanyu FM music Carnival. ‘Nothing Compares’ was released in Feb 2002 on Sanyu FM.

Later that year, under the mentorship of iconic Ugandan singer/producer Steve Jean, Lyrical G went on to pursue a solo career which would see him top the East African charts with back to back hit singles from his debut album 'Live From East Africa'.

Lyrical G has worked with South African rapper Proverb, T.I.D from Tanzania, the UK's Mas Law, Typical Fefe & Tyonne from Barbados and Outrageous Records in South Africa.

Lyrical G's catalogue consists of 11 studio albums. "Live From East Africa" released in 2004, "Narudi" in 2006, "First and Flow Most" in 2007, "Tha GMC Project" released in 2009, "Simple & Plain", 2010,"1st & Flow Most 2:Back 2 Basics"(2012),"Grown Man Talk", 2013 ,"Feel Good Music", 2014, "Geezy", 2019, 'OG', 2023., and the recently released "Black Boy",2026.

== Discography ==
=== Albums ===
- Live From East Africa, 2004
- Narudi, 2006
- 1st & Flow Most, 2007
- Tha GMC Project, 2009
- Simple & Plain, 2010
- 1st & Flow Most II, Back 2 Basics, 2012
- Grown Man Talk, 2013
- Feel Good Music, 2014
- Geezy, 2019
- OG, 2023
- Black Boy, 2026

=== Albums featured on ===
- K2 by Klear Kut, 2002
- Fever by Steve Jean, 2003
- First Love Album, 2003
- Nod Your Head by Obsessions, 2004
- Nubian Queen by Dorothy Bukirwa, 2005
- The UG Allstar Compilation, 2005
- The Walter Reed Project Allstar Album, 2006
- End Of The Weak Allstar Album, 2014
- A Few Good Friends, 2021
- EGO The Album by Kracbone, 2021
- Creative Freedom by Rugged Made, 2022
- Underrated by The Clansmen, 2022
- Bring The Noise by Notes & Noise Allstars, 2025

=== Singles ===
- At'oba (w/ Bataka Underground), 1999
- Ssesetula (w/ Bataka Underground), 1999
- Ain't No Good (w/ Steve Jean) 2003
- East Africa Party, 2003
- Raw Steez, 2004
- Tha Roof (w/ Steve Jean), 2004
- Need 2 Know (w/ Obsessions), 2004
- Welcome 2 Kampala (w/ Ngoni, Michael Ross, Benon & Vamposs, Saba Saba, Chagga, Papito), 2005
- Friday (w/ Dorothy), 2005
- Narudi, 2005
- Mother Africa (w/ Hiphop Allstarz), 2005
- Hey U, 2006
- Brand New Day (w/ Hiphop Allstarz), 2006
- Art Of War (w/ Babaluku), 2007
- Kazanyo (w/ Rocky Giant), 2007
- Back At It Again, 2008
- Songa, 2009
- Complicated, 2009
- So Fly, 2010
- Kyana Kiwala, 2010
- Kla City, 2010
- Twist Dat Spit (w/ Hardcore Prince), 2012
- Think About It, 2012
- Daddy Loves U, 2013
- Get Ya Hustle On (w/ St Nelly-sade), 2013
- Hey Gal, 2013
- Babiri, 2014
- Feel Good Music, 2014
- Extra Love (w/ Foever & Nemesis), 2014
- UG Cypher 2 (w/ Navio, 3 Card, Nelly- sade, Ninja-C, Ruyonga, Enygma, Mith, BigTril, Mun G, Tucker HD, Flex D'Paper), 2015
- Gangsta (w/ Deejay Crim & T-Bro), 2018
- Never Gon Change (w/ Judas Rapknowledge), 2018
- Float, 2018
- Tha Life (Kubaala) (w/ Unique), 2019
- Atamukutte, 2019
- Tuli Majje (w/ Oki Foever, Ossie Entrance, Eazy Tex, B-Money & 207), 2019
- Keep It Lit, 2019
- Been Bout My Thang (w/ GNL Zamba), 2020
- Twebaza, 2020
- Brother's Keeper (w/A Few Good Friends), 2020
- Never Knew Pain
- Put Domestic Violence On Lockdown(w/Code 9), 2020
- Thank You Father (w/Julius Sese), 2021
- MTN Legendary Cypher (w/ Navio & Babaluku),2021
- The Honorables Theme Song, 2022
- Sikyasaaga, 2022
- With It With It (w/Stone Age UG), 2022
- Kika (w/Tryton Muzik), 2022
- Nzikiriza (The Love Joint), 2022
- It's Your Life (w/ Rhymer)
- OG, 2023
- Linda (w/Judah Rapknowledge & Twice Nice Mateke), 2024
- Notes & Noise Cypher (w/Notes & Noise Allstars),2025
- Ayo (w/Af3kuru),2025
- Undisputed
- Close To You
- Black Boy (w/ Kulcha)
- Ki Kyomanyi (w/ St. Nelly-Sade)

== Awards and recognition ==
- MTN UG Hiphop Awards Lyricist Of The Year 2022 MTN Uganda Hip Hop Awards 2022 All The Winners
- MTN UG Hiphop Awards 2021 Producer Of The Year: KozNEfekt (Atamukutte)
- MTN UG Hiphop Lifetime Achievement Award Winner 2020 MTN UG Hip Hop Awards 2020: All the winners
- Pearl of Africa Music(PAM) Awards Best Hip Hop Single 2005(Mother Africa ft UG Hiphop Allstars) 2005 Winners & Nominees
- Pearl of Africa Music(PAM) Awards Best Hip Hop Artiste 2005 2006 Winners & Nominees
- Pearl of Africa Music(PAM) Awards Best Hip Hop Artiste 2006 2006 Winners
- Pearl of Africa Music(PAM) Awards Best Hip Hop Single 2006(Hey U ft Pinky 2006 Winners

Nominations:

- Pearl Of Africa Music Hip hop Artiste Of The Year Nominee: 2004, 2005, 2006 & 2007
- Pearl Of Africa Music Hip Hop Single Of The Year Nomination:East Africa Party(2004), Narudi(2005), Mother Africa ft The Uganda Hiphop Allstars(2005), Hey U(2006), Brand New Day ft The Uganda Hiphop Allstars(2006), Art Of War(2007)
- Buzz Awards Top Hood Rapper of The Year Nominee:2007 & 2008
- MTN UG Hiphop Awards 2019 Video Of The Year: Gangsta w/Dj Crim & T-Bro
- MTN UG Hiphop Awards 2021 Album Of The Year: GEEZY, Producer Of The Year: Atamukutte
- MTN UG Hiphop Awards 2022 Lyricist Of The Year, Inspirational Song Of The Year: Never Knew Pain.
- Club UG Hiphop Awards 2023 Central Rapper Of The Year, Inspirational Song Of The Year: Thank You Father.
- UG Hiphop Awards 2025 Male Rapper of The Year
- UG Hiphop Awards 2025 Collaboration of The Year: Notes & Noise Cypher (w/ Notes & Noise Allstars)
- UG Hiphop Awards 2026 Producer Of The Year: Close To You
