= Wilson Bugembe =

Ugandan Pastor and Gospel Singer (born 1984)

Pastor Wilson Bugembe
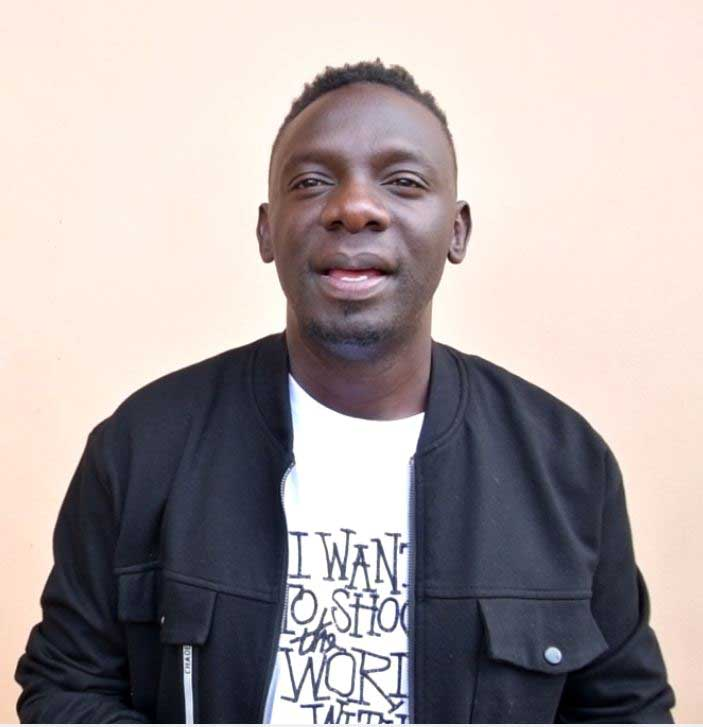
- Bugembe at 97.7 Record FM

Background information
- Born: August 8, 1984 (age 41); Masaka
- Occupation: Gospel Singer
- Years active: 2005–present
- Website: theworshiphouseug.org

Wilson Bugembe is a Ugandan pastor and gospel singer. He is the founder and senior pastor of Worship House, a mega church located in Nansana, Wakiso District, Uganda.

== Early life and education ==
Wilson Bugembe was born on August 8, 1984, in Masaka district, to Mr. and Mrs. Kirabira. He was orphaned at an early age, which saw him live part of his life on the streets. But he was able to attend school up to university, where he studied for only one semester and dropped out.

== Music ==
Bugembe started singing professionally when he was 19 years old. He release his first album "Yellow". His break through song was "Njagala Kumanya" which received airplay on top Radio and Television stations in Uganda. He has since had hit songs like "Komawo eka", "Bilibabitya", "Kani", "Bamuyita Yesu", "Yellow", "Lengera Embaata", "Komawo Eka", "Munaabe" and "Ani". He has worked with Sylver Kyagulanyi Icha Kavons and Isaiah Katumwa. He has released a number of albums like "Kani", "Ani", "Lengera Embaata", "Biribabitya" and "Ningirira".

Here is a list of some of his songs:

- Nsumulula
- Simbula Naye
- Waliwo Awona
- Siza
- Mbaga
- Emigugu
- Katonda (Y'abadde Mw'Eno Ensonga
- Yesu Yesu
- Tusize
- Katonda
- Nakibuka
- Winner
- God Over Money
- Nkusabira Nyo
- Oli Mufere
- Kyamagero
- Essanyu
- Numya Kale
- Wanaaza
- Ani
- Kaninde
- Sala Zange
- Nfuula Zaabu
- Mwoyo Mutukuvu
- Bambi Dj
- Sibiwula
- Ddaala
- It's My Turn
- Mercy
- Kwata Omukono
- Mpangira
- Ani Yali Amanyi
- Talemwa
- Ani Yali Amanyi
- Kani
- Komawo Eka
- Bamuyita Yesu
- Bamuyita Yesu
- Ekkubo
- Njakuyitayo
- Biliba Bitya
- Mukama Mulungi
- Nangirira
- Katonda Byakola
- Oliwagulu Yesu
- Njagala Nyo Mukama
- Mpangira
- Bilibabitya

== See also ==
- Judith Babirye
- Baby Gloria
- Betty Nakibuuka
- Justine Nabbosa
- Levixone
- Mac Elvis
- Gabie Ntaate
- Brian Lubega

== Awards and recognition ==
- Best Gospel Artist Pearl of Africa Music Awards 2007.
- Best Gospel Single (Komawo Eka) in Pearl of Africa Music Awards 2008.
- Best Gospel Artist Pearl of Africa Music Awards 2008.
- The song "Daala" by Pastor Wilson Bugembe won the overall Song of the Year award at the VIGA Awards in 2016.
- His life story documentary won the International Christian Film Awards in 2023, showcasing the impact of his journey.
