= Levixone =

Ugandan gospel musician (born 1992)

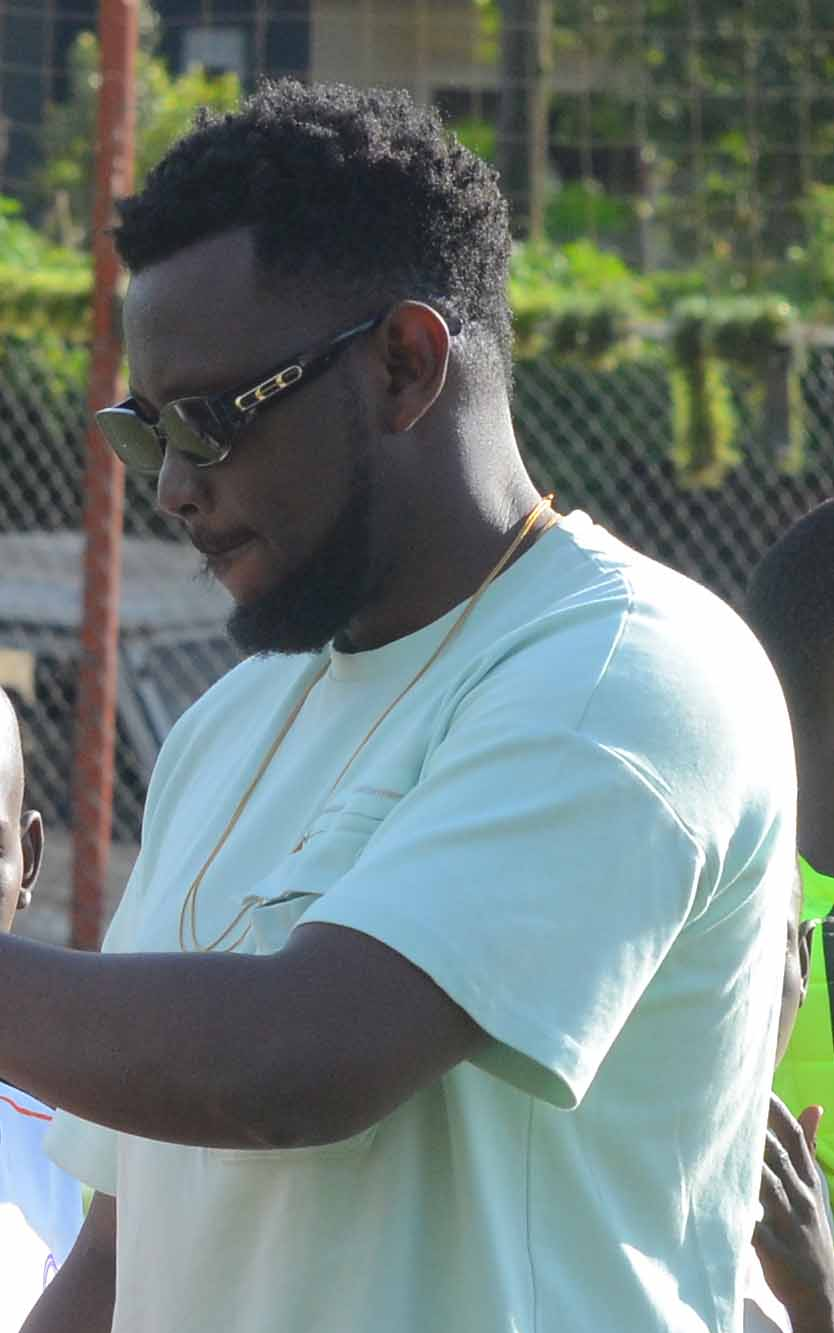

Background information
- Born: 7 December 1992 (age 33); Uganda
- Genre: All African
- Occupation: musician
- Instruments: Vocals, guitar
- Years active: 2010–present
- Label: Swangz Avenue
- Website: www.levixone.com

Levixone (born 7 December 1992), whose real name is Sam Lucas Lubyogo, is a Ugandan gospel musician. He has won several awards internationally and locally including the 2018 sauti awards(USA) for East African Male Artiste of the Year and The 2021 Vine awards for Male artiste of the year. He has won over 51 accolades and Staged 9 Big successful concerts in the history of Ugandan Gospel music Since 2012.

== Early life and education ==
Levixone was born in Uganda and spent most of his childhood in Kosovo, a slum in Kampala. He grew up in a family of six children and was raised by his mother after his father died when he was young. Levixone’s passion for music began at a young age and he started singing in church at the age of 10.

== Music career ==
Levixone began his music career in 2013 with the release of his debut single “Nonya Omu” which became an instant hit. He has since released several other songs including “Ponya”, “Esaala”, “Ani”, and “Turn the Replay” among others. Levixone has collaborated with several other artists including Timeless Noel, Exodus, and Coopy Bly among others.

In 2018, Levixone won the Groove Award for East African Male Artiste of the Year. He has also been nominated for several other awards including the 2019 Maranatha Global Worship Music Awards.

== Discography ==
Here is a list of some of his songs.

- Turn the Replay
- Ponya
- Mbeera
- Esaala
- Ani
- More Blessings
- Ronaldo
- Hossanah
- Jungle
- Chikibombe
- Zikomo
- Noonya Omu
- Samanya
- Lanji
- Wedding Story
- Hope
- Niwewe
- Ekyisa
- Mukutu
- Yeggwe
- Unshakable
- Spin Doctor
- Tompitako

== Awards and nominations ==
- 2018 Groove Award for East African Male Artiste of the Year (Winner).
- 2019 Maranatha Global Worship Music Awards (Nominee).
- Best Gospel artist (East Africa) in the Rhema Awards 2021 edition.

== Personal life ==
In August 2025, Levixone was introduced to the family of Ugandan singer Desire Luzinda in a traditional ceremony held in Matugga, Wakiso District. The families indicated plans for a wedding on 15 August 2025.

On 15 August 2025, Levixone and Desire Luzinda were married in a private ceremony at Serena Hotel, Kigo. The wedding was officiated by Apostle Grace Lubega of Phaneroo Ministries International and attended by close family and friends.

== See also ==
- List of Ugandan musicians
- Judith Babirye
- Baby Gloria
- Betty Nakibuuka
- Mac Elvis
- Coopy Bly
- Gabie Ntaate
