= Baby Gloria =

Ugandan gospel artist (born 2001)

Gloria Mulungi Senyonjo
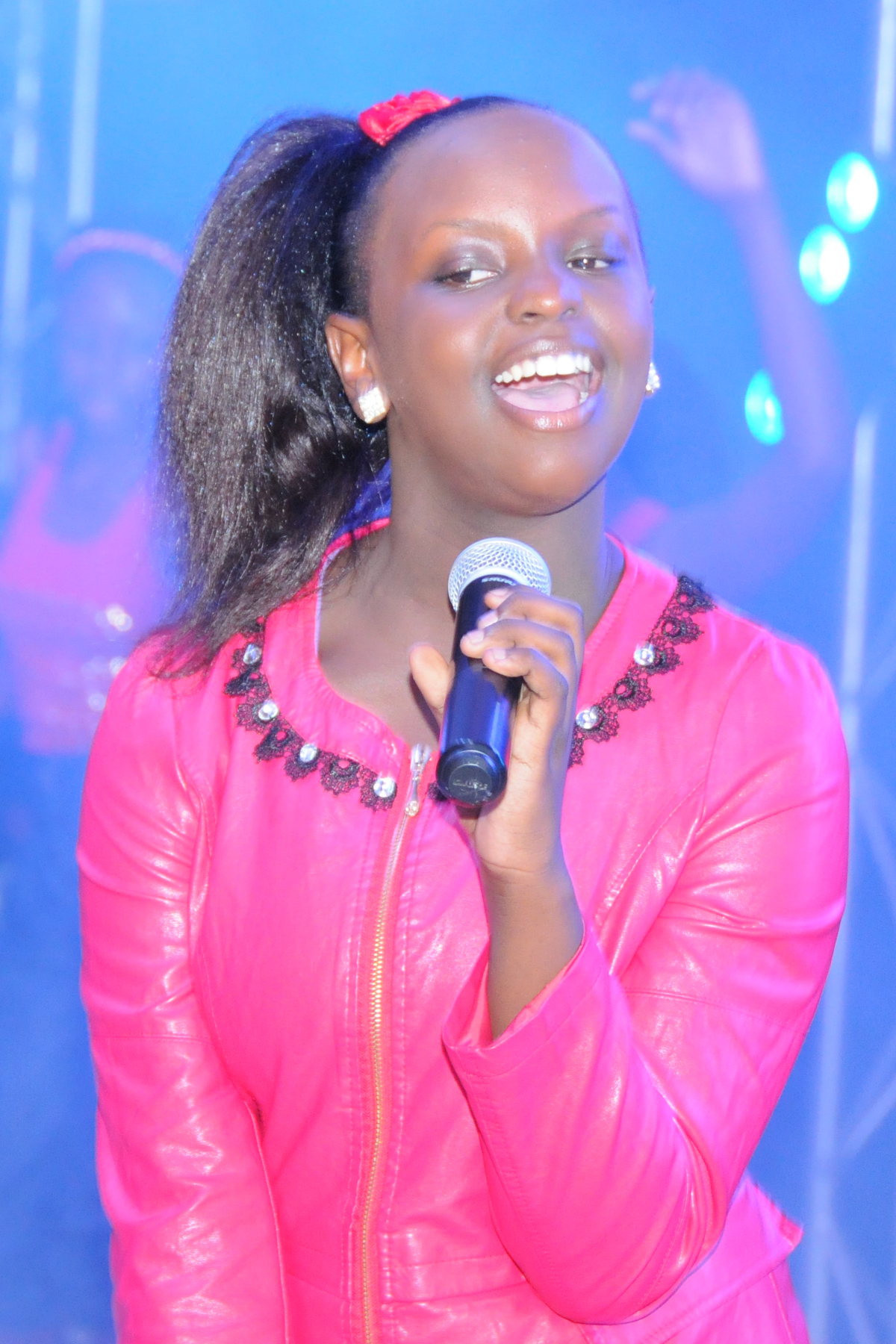
- Born: 28 October 2001 (age 24)
- Citizenship: Uganda
- Education: Apollo Kaggwa primary school Mengo, Life international school
- Occupation: Musician
- Years active: 2005—
- Organization: Gloria Hearts
- Parents: John Senyonjo (father); Betty Nakibuuka (mother)

Gloria Mulungi Senyonjo (born 28 October 2001), better known by her stage name Baby Gloria, is a Ugandan gospel artist. She started singing at the age of two and a half years. In 2010, she won the Tumaini Musical Award, followed by the Olive Musical Award in 2011.

== Early life and education ==
She was born to John Senyonjo and Betty Nakibuuka, who is also a Ugandan gospel artist. John Senyonjo is the manager of Baby Gloria and Betty Nakibuka. Baby Gloria is the first-born in the family and she went to Sir Apollo Kaggwa primary school in Mengo and later joined Life international school. She fellowships at Omega healing church in Namasuba, Wakiso district where Pastor Kyazze is the lead pastor.

== Career ==
In 2005, Baby Gloria released her first songs: "Mummy" and "Sisobola kukyawa". At age 14, she held her first concert at Sir Apollo Kaggwa primary school. The charity concert raised money to help needy children in Luzira. Her next concert was held at the Uganda National Museum in 2011. She is a dancer, guitarist, and a commercial brand ambassador of Movit products. She was among the hosts of MTN Pulse Awards in 2020. She featured in Pearl Magic Prime's reality show Kampala Creme in 2024; she later left the show, calling it fake and scripted.

In 2016, Baby Gloria established a charity organization, Gloria Hearts, which helps less privileged children.

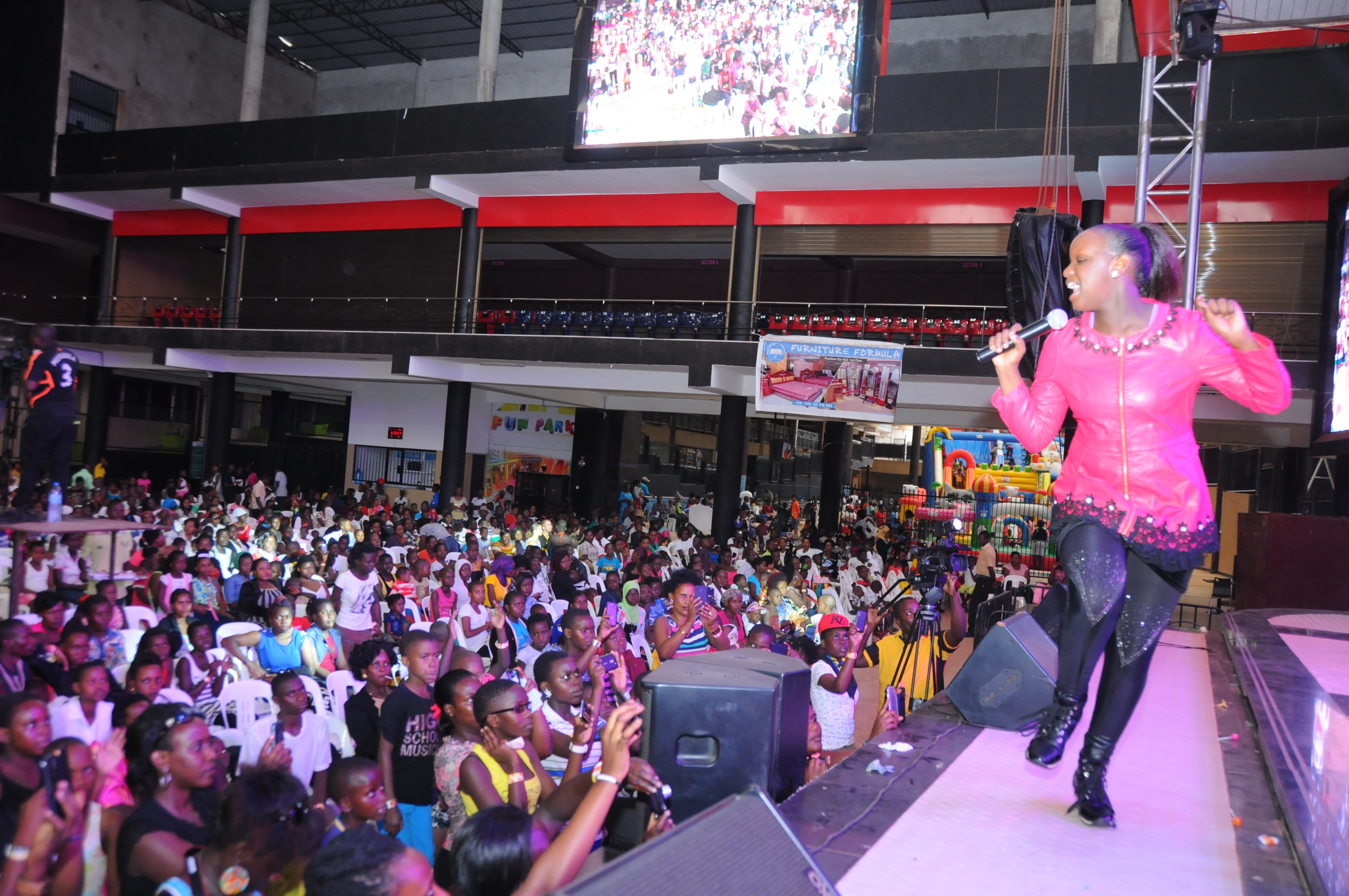
Baby Gloria

== Discography ==
Some of her songs:

- Mummy, 2005
- Sisobola kukyawa, 2005
- Mbu ndi lubuto, 2015
- Okusaba, 2016
- God win
- Remote control
- Talanta
- I will never forsake you
- Luyimba lwo
- Mujje tusanyuke, 2016
- Daddy wange
- Church swag
- Happy birthday
- I have a friend
- Mwooyo wange
- Nazukuse nga nyimbya
- Ooh holy nigh

=== Collaboration ===
Some of her collaborations:

- DNA feat RUYONGA
- Save a life feat Levixone

== Personal life ==
On 29 August 2025, Gloria is married to Jonas Mbaleka. The couple had their wedding officiated at Redeemed Church in Makerere, Kampala

== Awards and nominations ==
- Buzz Tenniez Awards, Best Gospel Song, 2019
- Hipipo MUSIC Awards 2018
  - Best Religious Gosepl Singer (nominated)
  - Best Religious Gospel Video (Mbu Ndi Lubuto, nominated)
- London African gospel awards nominations

== See also ==
- Levixone
- Ruyonga
- Wilson Bugembe
- Betty Nakibuuka
- Deborah Nantongo Cleave
