= Peter Miles (musician) =

Ugandan musical artist

- Born: Peter Kanyike; 29 September 1980 (age 45); Entebbe, Uganda
- Genres: Reggae; dancehall
- Occupation: Musician
- Awards: Best East African Video at Channel O Spirit of Africa Music Video Awards, 2007

Peter Miles , born Peter Kanyike, is a Ugandan reggae and dancehall artist. He sings in Luganda, Patwa and English. He appeared on the Vuqa cypher, A song alongside rappers Bigtril, The mith, Ruyonga, St Nelly Sade and more others in 2016.

== Early life and education ==
Peter Miles was born on 29 September 1980 in Entebbe, Uganda. He attended Buddo junior school, St Lawrence secondary, Kabojja high school and Makerere University.

== Music ==
Miles has collaborated with artists like Navio (rapper), Elephant Man (musician) on the remix of "Nice and polite", Demarco (musician) on "Blessings", "General Levy" on "Ooh Aah". He has had hits songs like "One time","Owange","Muwala","Ruckus","Oah Aah" and "Combination". Miles has won a number of awards in Africa including: Best Ragga artist/group PAM AWARDS for 2 years,) Best Ragga dancehall video Channel O awards (SOUTH AFRICA) Best Dancehall Video Kisima awards (KENYA). On 7 June 2007, Peter Miles was the only artist from East and Central Africa selected to perform at the anti G8 summit concert code named the"P8 concert" in Rostock"Germany alongside big European bands like U2, Bono, Bob Geldolf, Seed and Africa's Youssou N’dour.

In November 2025, he entirely quite music to focus on businesses like Miles Marines company which has cruises on Lake Victoria for tourists.

== Discography ==
- One time
- Tumetokachini
- Love
- Nice and polite
- Ooh ahh
- Blessings
- Front line
- Nyinimu
- Ruckus
- Muwala

== Awards and recognition ==
- Best East African Video at Channel O Spirit of Africa Music Video Awards, 2007.
