= Lumix Da Don =

Ugandan rapper

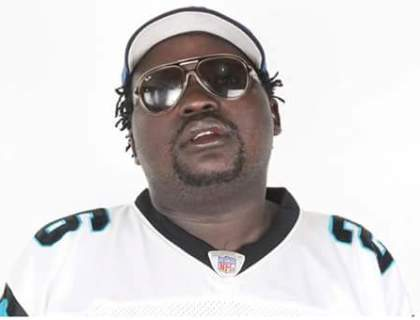

Background information
- Born: Patrick Lumumba; February 21, 1978
- Origin: Gulu, Uganda
- Died: July 13, 2015 (aged 37) (buried Laroo, Gulu City)
- Genre: Hip hop/luo rap
- Occupations: Hip hop emcee/producer
- Years active: 1995–2015
- Label: Valley Curve Recordz
- Website: www.reverbnation.com/valleycurverecordz

Patrick Lumumba (February 21, 1978 – July 13, 2015), known professionally as Lumix Da Don, was a Ugandan rapper, record producer, founder and CEO of Valley Curve Recordz based in Ntinda, Kampala.

Lumix produced and recorded the greatest number of singles in Ugandan history. Lumix is considered one of the founding fathers of hip hop in Uganda.

Most of Lumix's singles were either freestyles or were written 5–10 minutes before being recorded.

== Career ==
Lumix Da Don attended Jinja College School in Jinja district of Uganda. While at Jinja College, he participated in rap contests. He started with a group called SNAG N' O and later formed the Disciples of Apocalypse (DOA).

This involved his going out and rapping in different night spots in Kampala in the company of other emcees including Lyrical G, Krazy Native a.k.a. Saba Saba, Saint CA, Easy Tex, MC Yalla, Sylvester,and Abrahams.

Lumix won rap battles in Uganda that were organized at Club Silk, making him the three-time battle winner for three consecutive years (1998, 1999 and 2000).

In 2003, he recorded his first song, "Get Down", but felt something was lacking in the production. He then embarked on mastering the art of production, thus creating his own sound.

By 2005, he had created a 14 track album titled Inpe Ngeyo (literally, You Don't Know), from which he garnered a massive following in Northern Uganda. He then became widely known for his rhymes.

== Production ==
In 2006 he became an executive producer for the "Hip Hop Canvas". Its emcees included Lyrical G, The LuoAncestors (Gipir and Labong), Emma Katya, Saint CA, Krazy Native and Easy Tex.

Lawraid Vibes, Easy Tex, Oukins, and Junior Lee are producers who were mentored by Lumix Da Don. Another notable emcee that grew under Lumix's watch is GNL, for whom Lumix mentored and produced for Omusajja in 2005.

== Death ==
On 13 July 2015 Lumix Da Don died due to liver failure. He was buried in his ancestral home in Laroo Division in Gulu district, Uganda.

That evening there was a football match between the artistes and radio presenters where all the funds raised were taken to the family. There was also a fundraiser concert.

GNL Zamba posted on his Facebook page, "He recorded my first demo for the songs yenze & Lukka on the Album koi koi at 3am after walking from ntinda centre with Easy teks to his house and we worked together on the Hip Hop canvass project.True Manhood song too, we Battled whenever we met, freestyled together. Lumix has been a true Pioneer of HipHop in Uganda. The loss of another Ntinda soldier, LugaFlow General, Friend and Ol'G. I will miss you Lumix."

Up to date he's still considered the Godfather of HipHop in Northern Uganda by fellow rappers like Judah RapKnowledge Da AkBar, Exaa RapKing & Timcence among few to mention from Nothern part of the country.

== Accolades and honors ==
In 2011, Lumix Da Don was awarded Northern Uganda's Artiste of the Year in Uganda's PAM (Pearl of Africa Music) Awards for the single "Dirty Job".

On 2 January 2016, he won a posthumous award for "Try" as the Single of the Year at the Northern Uganda Entertainment Awards (NUEA).

Lumix is considered the foundation stone for hip hop in Northern Uganda and partly Uganda at large. He influenced such MC's as NL Squad (YBP, Tim Tovi and Big Pryce), Tha Rawfam, Detroit, D-Trick, Detroit, Fx, GNL Zamba, Lyrical G, Nob D, GOC (Guys Of Controversy), Heights, and Fellipe.
