= Flex D'Paper =

- Born: Alex Julius Kwesigabo; 19 January 1990 (age 36); Kampala, Uganda
- Genres: Hip Hop / Trap
- Occupations: Rapper, Producer
- Instrument: Vocals
- Website: www.itsflexdpaper.com

Alex Julius Kwesigabo (born 19 January 1990), better known by his stage name Flex D'Paper, is an Ugandan rapper and songwriter from Kampala, Uganda. He was part of the high school rap group, The Rapaholix which he started with friends, Dasper Cosine and later joined by A Pass as an affiliate. The trio put out a mix tape, "The Eviction Notice” which included chart topping singles like "Burning", "Party Life" and "Follow Me" (with Allan Toniks) which topped countdowns in Uganda such as NTV and Sanyu FM.

He was also part of the 2014 UG Cypher including the finest Ugandan rappers: Navio, Keko, Big Tril, Don MC, AirporTaxi rappers (Tucker and LLyboc) St. Nelly Sade, GNL Zamba, DJ Global, JB, The Mith, Ruyonga, and Atlas.

== Early life and education ==
Flex D'Paper was born on 19 January 1990 in Kampala. He comes from a family of eight children. For his primary school, he studied at Greenhill Academy and his secondary school at Seeta High School for Ordinary Level and St. Mary's Kitende for Advanced level. He later enrolled in Makerere University for a degree in Information Technology.

== Career ==
=== 2012–2016: Eviction Notice Mixtape and other recordings ===
During an interview with Hot 100.9 fm in Uganda, Flex D'Paper explained how he got his name from being flexible because of the different styles of music that he can write as well as ghostwrite for other artists, while Paper comes from being motivated to get the money, and change his environment for the better. It's on the same interview that he says, he gets his influence from Jay Z, The Notorious B.I.G., Nas and more. Together with the group, they performed at many High school occasions and later went ahead to release a joint mixtape in 2013, with Ugandan chart topping singles like "Shutting Down Towns" featuring Martha Smallz produced by Aethan, a top hip hop producer in Uganda. and "Follow Me" featuring Allan Toniks. In 2013, Flex D'Paper went ahead to do solo music, and followed it up with the hit "More" featuring Kemishan. Produced by Baru.

In 2014, he released the single "Leader" with Sheila Wya which premiered on Bryan Mckenzie's Weekly top twenty countdown, on Radiocity. a popular radio and TV personality in Uganda. It was also played and featured on Mister Deejay's SNMS show, another popular radio personality in Uganda. Flex D'Paper released the video to "Leader" in 2015, a song that went ahead to make it to most countdowns in Uganda and East Africa as well.

In 2015, Flex D'Paper was invited by the United States Embassy in Kampala, Uganda to rap and perform alongside the Next Level group while in Kampala, An initiative of the US State Dept & UNC Music Department to send artists around the world to use hip-hop as a tool for cultural diplomacy & conflict resolution. He has shared a stage and performed alongside artists like Navio, Maro, Megaloh, Ghanaian Stallion GNL Zamba, Allan Toniks, Keko, Chameleone Bebe Cool, Octopizzo from Kenya Radio & Weasel among others and opened for international act, Ne-Yo. In 2015, Flex D'Paper was once again among the top rappers/ emcees to be featured on the official Ugandan rap cypher (Ug Cypher 2) that included Navio, the mith, Ruyonga, and St. Nelly-Sade among others. In 2016, Flex D'Paper put out a Ugandan remix to popular Kenyan song Ting Badi Malo, originally performed by Khaligraph Jones and later Day Ones, featuring Navio and Martha Smallz. The song made it to number one on the biggest Urban radios in Uganda, like Sanyu Fm and Radiocity's Top Twenty Countdown. and later was listed among the top Hip Hop songs from Uganda for 2016, by Tribe.Ug.

In October 2016, Flex D'Paper after releasing a compilation CD, with the different freestyles and singles he set off for a city tour in Europe performing at festivals and clubs starting with Stuttgart, Frankfurt and Berlin in Germany and later Brussels.

MTV Base in November 2016, named Flex among the top MCs from Uganda on the Base Top MCs Uganda list 2016.

=== 2017: Not For Sale mixtape release and other recordings ===
In 2017, he went on to put out his first solo mixtape Not For Sale (mixtape) in June, that featured the chart topping single Yenze Aliko produced by Mio Made. The mixtape also includes "Never Give Up" a collaboration recorded with Germany rapper, Mako Loco.

"Day Ones" featuring Navio and Martha Smallz, a single off the mixtape was nominated for The Buzz Teeniez Awards for Hip Hop Song of the year. The remix to the song was later put out featuring Mako Loco and P Bane both rappers from Germany.

On 16 October 2017, the Mixtape release party was held at the Uganda Germany Cultural Center a platform he used to introduce other various artists to show case as well.

In the Ug Hip Hop Awards 2017, the mixtape won Mixtape Of The Year award

=== 2019 ===
"Yenze Aliko", a single by Flex won the song of the year award at MTN UG Hip Hop awards On 8 February 2019 at the annual MTN Ug HipHop awards, Flex D'Paper's single Yenze Aliko was announced as the Song Of The Year.

In 2020, he launched the "Eno Hip Hop" festival, an event planned to happen annually celebrating Hip Hop. The festival that had performers from Uganda, Kenya and DRC happened in December as a two-day event.

=== 2021 - present ===
Flex released his debut album, Kampala Boy on 10 December 2021. The album debuted at Number 4 on its first day on the Apple iTunes charts All Genres category in Uganda, with singles in the Top 100 on the charts too.

In 2023, Flex D'Paper was nominated five times at the UG Hip Hop Awards 2023, where he won two awards, Album of the Year for his album Kampala Boy as well as Collaboration of the Year for his song Cheptegei, which features Navio, Fik Fameica and Mozelo Kidz.

== Discography ==
=== Singles ===
Day Ones	2016	(featuring Navio and Martha Smallz) Produced by The Aethan
Yenze Aliko	2017	Produced by Mio Made
Level Up	2019	Produced by Mio Made
Mbikwasagwe feat. Shena Skies	2020	Produced by Aethan Music
Cheptegei	2022	Produced by Mio Made
Nkola Mpya feat. Keko	2022	Produced by Aethan Music

=== Mixtapes ===
Not for Sale mixtape by Flex D'Paper

=== Albums ===
- Kampala Boy

== Awards and nominations ==
Year	Award Ceremony	Prize	Work/Recipient
2016	UG Hip Hop Awards	Best Inspirational Song	Victory Song ft. Ruyonga and Levixone
2017	Buzz Teeniez Awards	Hip Hop Song Of The Year	Day Ones ft. Navio and Martha Smallz
2017	UG Hip Hop Awards	Mix tape Of The Year	NOT FOR SALE
2017	UG Hip Hop Awards	Sweet 16 (Verse of the Year)	6AM In Nairobi freestyle
2019	MTN UG Hip Hop Awards	Song Of The Year	Yenze Aliko
2019	HiPipo Music Awards	Rap Song Of The Year	Yenze Aliko
2020	MTN UG Hip Hop Awards	Video Of The Year	Level Up
2020	Hipipo Music Awards	Hip Hop Song Of The Year	Level Up
2021	MTN UG HIP HOP AWARDS	Inspirational Song Of The Year	Mbikwasagwe feat. Shena Skies
2021	Janzi Awards	Outstanding Hip Hop artist of the year	Mbikwasagwe feat. Shena Skies
2022	Galaxy Zzina Awards	Hip Hop artist of the year	Mbikwasagwe feat. Shena Skies
2023	UG Hip Hop Awards	Song of the Year	Flex D'Paper ft. Navio Fik Fameica and Mozelo Kidz – Cheptegei
2023	UG Hip Hop Awards	Male Rapper of the Year	Kampala Boy
2023	UG Hip Hop Awards	Album of the Year	Kampala Boy
2023	UG Hip Hop Awards	Rap Fusion of the Year	Flex D'Paper ft. Apass – Not My Friends
2023	UG Hip Hop Awards	Collaboration of the Year	Flex D'paper ft. Navio Fik Fameica And Mozelo Kidz – Cheptegei

== Rapaholix clothing line ==
In 2012, Flex D'Paper created his clothing line, The Rapholix Wear. The brand has gained popularity over time, especially among the youth and different public figures.

== Eno Hip Hop Festival ==
Flex D'Paper founded the Eno Hip Hop festival in 2021 with the first edition being an online virtual show due to COVID-19 restrictions and it featured various Hip Hop artists from different parts of Uganda and the world.

The second edition was held on 9 December 2023. This time around it was a physical concert with fans in attendance to catch the performances.

== Endorsements and campaigns ==
- One Million Campaign Against Cancer (1MC)

In 2015, Flex D'Paper together with other artists, Keko, Daisy Ejang, Nava Grey, and comedian Pablo among others joined the One Million Campaign Against Cancer, a campaign by Uganda Child Cancer Foundation aimed at supporting children and young persons suffering from cancer in Uganda.

=== Ambition Mission ===
In 2015, Flex D'Paper was also among the young artists and public figures who represented the Ambition Mission. Some of the artists include Juliana Kanyomozi, Eddy Kenzo, Mun G among others. The non-government organization was behind campaigns like "I Am Ambition Mission, Sili Taaba", an anti-tobacco campaign.

- Viva con Agua de Sankt Pauli

In March 2016, Flex D'Paper was part of the artists in Uganda that joined Viva con Agua de Sankt Paul a charity-based organization located in St. Pauli/Hamburg campaigning for fresh water, sanitation and hygiene (WASH).

The organization held a concert where the artists including Flex D'Paper performed alongside some international acts like Octopizzo from Kenya, Ghanaian Stallion, Lady Slyke, Sylvester & Abramz among others.

In 2017, at the World Water Day celebrations held in Moroto Uganda, he performed alongside other ambassadors keko, The Mith, and Maro. He later performed at the We Love Youganda festival held on 2 December and organized by Viva con Agua de Sankt Pauli Kampala office alongside various artists like Maro, Navio, Muthoni from Rwanda and more including Chef Boss from Germany.

In 2018, he was among the headliners for the WE LOVE YOUGANDA concert 2019 held at the square on 17 November 2018. The show included performances from Ugandan artists as well as top German rapper Samy Deluxe.
