= George Stanley Nsamba =

Ugandan film director (born 1989)

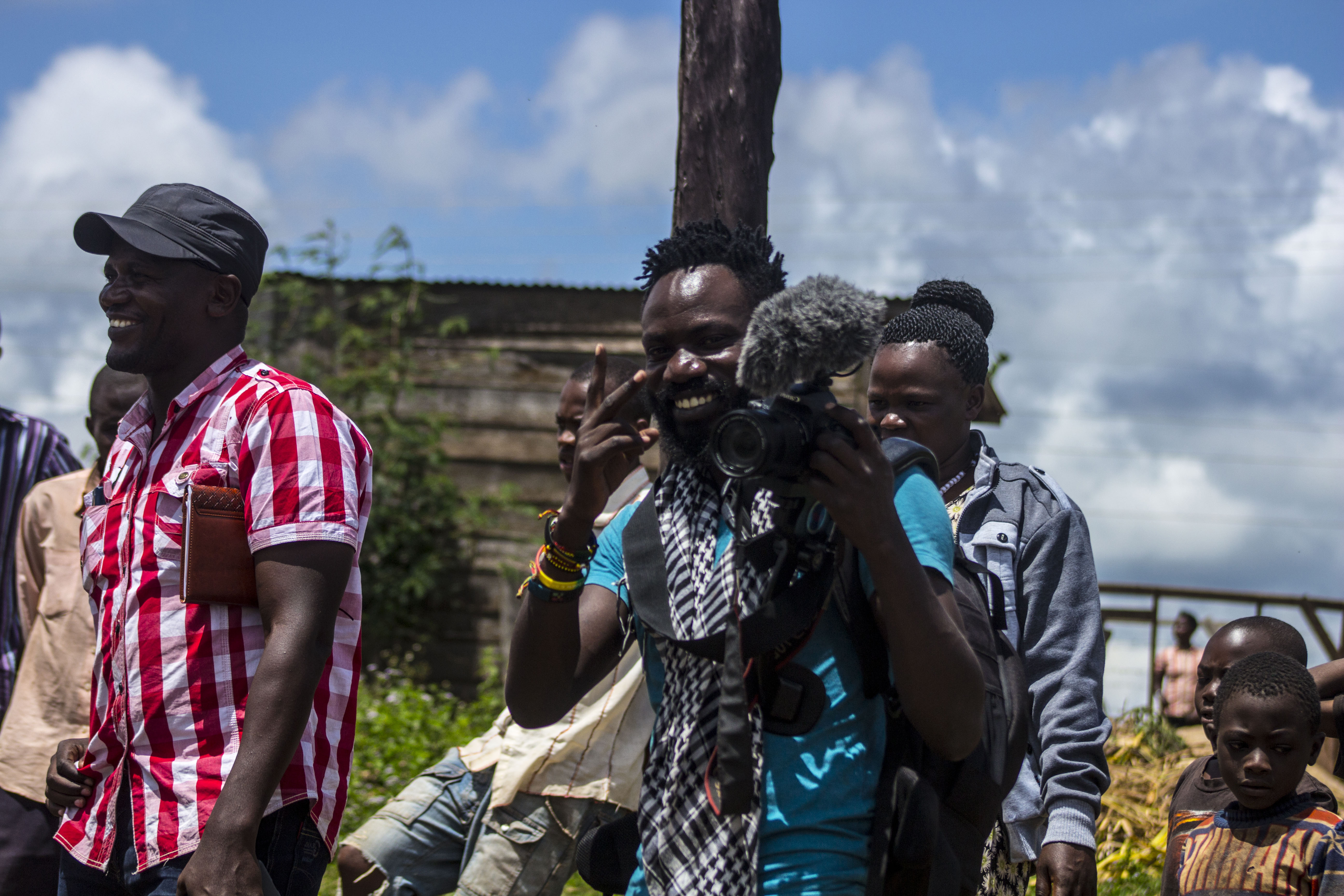
- George Stanley Nsamba at the Cast The Light On Prejudice Exhibition in Kampala, 2015
- Born: Ediu George Stanley Nsamba; 14 October 1989 (age 37); Mulago, Kampala, Uganda
- Other name: Nes
- Education: Makerere University
- Occupation: Filmmaker
- Years active: 2012–present
- Notable work: Crafts:The Value Of Life, Silent Depression, The Dummy Team, The Ghetto Film Project in 2013
- Relatives: 2

Ediu George Stanley Nsamba, also known as "Nes" (born 14 October 1989) is a Ugandan film producer, director, cinematographer, screenwriter, editor, spoken-word artist and human rights activist.

== Early life ==
Nsamba was born in Mulago Hospital in the capital city of Uganda Kampala and grew up in the slums of Naguru. Born to a social worker mum Mrs Vicky Aryenyo and his father Musisi costantine who worked at Mulago Hospital, his family lived a typical middle-class family in Uganda until his parents divorced when he was 6 letting him and his two siblings grow up with a single mother. Much as he cannot count how many siblings he has on his father's side, he is the second born of three kids with the older sister Doreen Apiny and younger brother Brian Smith Were. He is a college dropout from Makerere University where he was studying a bachelor's degree in Industrial and Fine Arts.

His parents having divorced in 1996, Nsamba, his mother and two siblings moved to Naguru-go-down, a huge slum in Kampala, into an unfinished building which flooded when it rained and construction went on as they lived in it. After being diagnosed with HIV, his mother was admitted at Nsambya hospital in 1998 and life became unbearable. Nsamba had to work as a kid carrying trash in exchange for old newspapers that he sold to put together money for his little brother's feeding. In 2010 after the death of his friend Ronnie in the July 2010 Kampala attacks, he overcame the drug addiction that he had battled with for nearly six years.

== Career ==
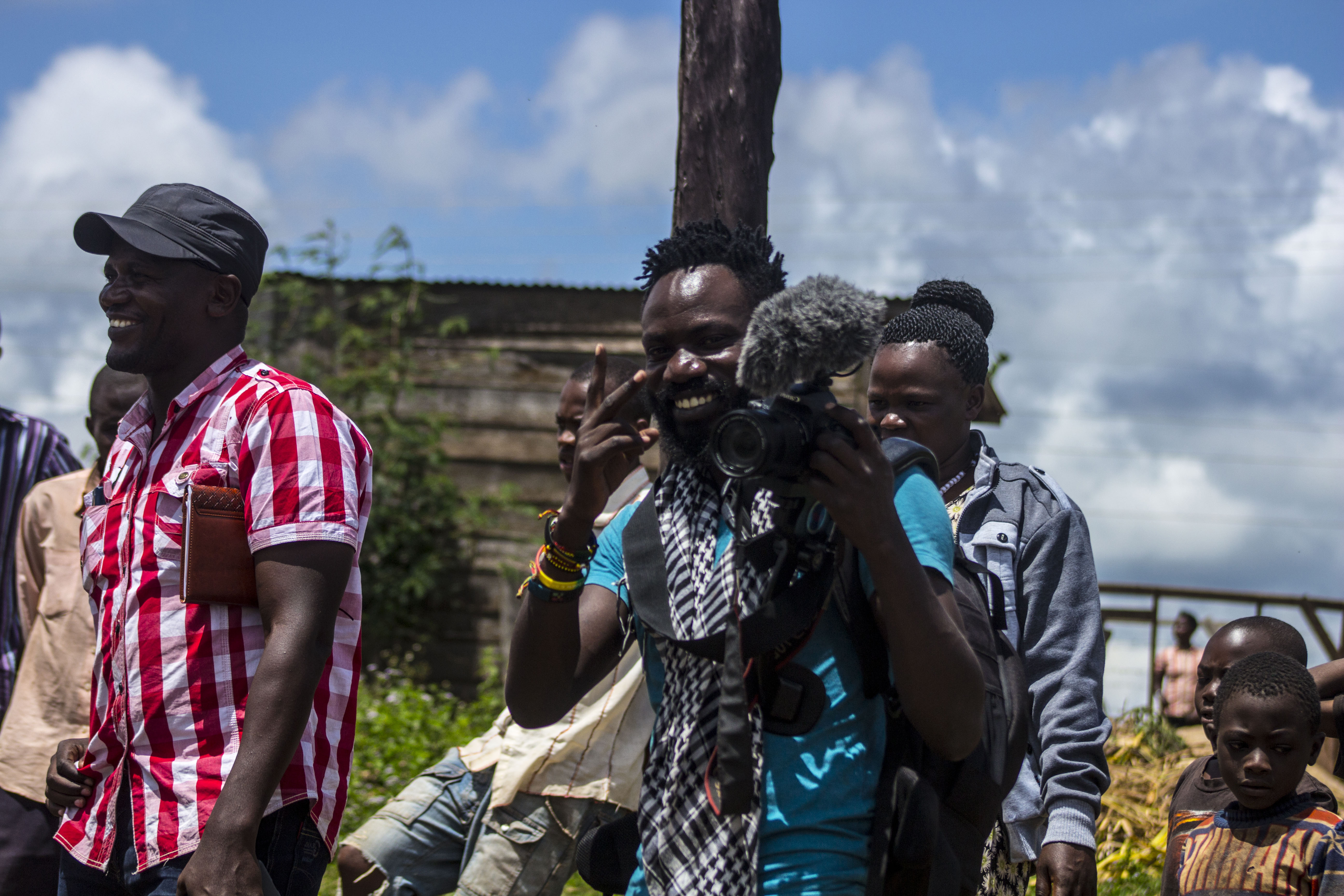
Nsamba on a documentary set in Isiniro in 2018

Nsamba broke through ranks with the successful hit video "Nzijukira" by rapper St. Nelly-Sade in 2012 but it was not until 2015 that he broke through the film industry with his debut short film Crafts: The Value Of Life which was produced under his charity organization 'The Ghetto Film Project'. Nsamba's second film, Silent Depression, was released 16 June 2015, and has since become a cult reference for the effect of smartphones on humanity. It was also regarded as the most prolific film that screened at the fifth annual Slum Film Festival in Nairobi by the press and digital media.

His first film The Wish, a tribute to the fight against cancer, starred little known but celebrated writer-artist-poet-entrepreneur Kidron Googo - Th' KlaFella. In 2012 he was one of the filmmakers whose short film scripts were chosen for the Mnet short film competition and that was the beginning of his film career having previously been affiliated with the hip hop industry. With the growing documentary ideas and script, he soon gained the trust and respect of many and his works through The Ghetto Film Project earned him a nomination at the Social Media Awards in 2013. In August 2014 he was part of the GhettoXXI Exhibition in Łódź, Poland, being the only African representative defining the ghetto in African perspective using photography.

In 2015 following his success and success story as a filmmaker using films made on a small budget for social change, he was chosen to be the main facilitator and mentor at the fifth annual Slum Film Festival in Nairobi, Kenya. He mentored a master class of 14 youth from the huge slums of Mathare, Kibera among other places for a two-week workshop from 10 to 20 August after which a short film dubbed Best Of Luck was developed. He also took part as the lead discussant with the Kenya Film Commission, PAWA254 among other stake holders in the Kenyan film industry in a series of meetings and workshops organized by Slum Film Festival on low budget film making and measure to improve and grow the quality of the Kenyan film industry.

== Personal life ==
After dropping out of Makerere University, Nsamba ventured into documentary film making and one day when shooting a documentary for Destiny Friends International an NGO in Uganda he realized there was need not just to take the kids and youth to school but equip them with practical life skills and started up an organization called The Ghetto Film Project in 2013. He has been recognized by among others the Rotary Club Of Kampala Central for his work with vulnerable kids in the ghetto under his organization in 2015.

== Filmography ==
- Crafts: The Value Of Life (2015)
- Silent Depression (2015)
- The Dummy Team (2016)
- Time Irreversible (2017)

== Recognition ==
=== Film festival nominations ===
Film festivals
Year	Film	Category	Festival	Result
2015	Crafts:The Value Of Life	Best Narrative Short Film	Silicon Valley African Film Festival	Nominated
2015	Crafts:The Value Of Life	Best Short Film (Live Action)	Siffcy	Nominated
2015	Silent Depression	Best Fiction Film	Luksuz Film Festival	Nominated
2015	Silent Depression	Best Short Film (Live Action)	Siffcy	Nominated
2016	The Dummy Team	Short Film	Lake International PanAfrican Film Festival	Won
2016	Silent Depression	Video Art Award	Zoom International Film Festival	Nominated
2016	Silent Depression	Best Short Film	Amakula International Film Festival	Nominated
2016	The Dummy Team	Best Narrative Short Film	Silicon Valley African Film Festival	Won
2017	Time Irreversible	Best Message In A Short Film	RoldaWebFest	Nominated

=== Film festival selections ===
Official selection
Year	Film	Festival	Country
2015	Crafts:The Value Of Life	Slum Film Festival	Nairobi, Kenya
2015	Crafts:The Value Of Life	International Peace And Film Festival	Orlando, Florida, USA
2015	Crafts:The Value Of Life	FilmAid Film Festival	Nairobi, Kenya
2015	Silent Depression	Slum Film Festival	Nairobi, Kenya
2016	Silent Depression	Amakula International Film Festival	Kampala, Uganda
2016	Crafts:The Value Of Life	Helsinki African Film Festival	Helsinki, Finland
2016	Crafts:The Value Of Life	Ozark Shorts	USA
2016	Silent Depression	Kampala Short Film Festival	Kampala, Uganda
2016	Crafts:The Value Of Life	Kampala Short Film Festival	Kampala, Uganda
2016	The Dummy Team	NollyFest Film Program	Lagos, Nigeria
2016	The Dummy Team	FilmAid Film Festival	Nairobi, Kenya
2016	The Dummy Team	IndieWise Virtual Film Festival	Miami, Florida, USA
2016	Crafts:The Value Of Life	IndieWise Virtual Film Festival	Miami, Florida, USA
2016	Silent Depression	Bayimba International Festival Of The Arts	Kampala, Uganda
2016	The Dummy Team	Bayimba International Festival Of The Arts	Kampala, Uganda
2017	Silent Depression	Ngalabi Short Film Festival	Kampala, Uganda
2017	Time Irreversible	Slum Film Festival	Nairobi, Kenya
2017	The Dummy Team	Africa International Film Festival	USA
2017	Time Irreversible	African International Film Festival	USA
