= Kampala Boy =

Studio album by Flex D'Paper
- Released: 10 December 2021
- Genres: Hip hop; Afrobeat; dancehall; EDM
- Length: 45 minutes
- Labels: Rapaholix Music: Konkrete Capital; Icon Studios Africa

Flex D'Paper chronology
Not for Sale (2017)	Kampala Boy (2021)

Kampala Boy is the first studio album by Ugandan musician Flex D'Paper, released on 10 December 2021. The album features guest appearances from Swae Lee on the intro and songs with Navio, Fik Fameica, A Pass, Keko, Shena skies, Wake the Poet, Mozelo Kidz, Kemishan, Lagum the rapper. The production includes Aethan Music, Mio Made, Sam Lamara, Wake the Poet, Bad Chwezi and Lucian.

== Background ==
In 2017, Flex D'Paper released his first compilation, the mixtape Not for Sale. The mixtape was released on 27 June 2017 digitally, and on 14 October 2017, physical copies were launched. The annual MTN UG Hip Hop awards awarded Flex D'Paper with the Mixtape of the year award The same year of release, the single Day Ones off the mixtape that features Navio (rapper) and Martha Smallz was as well nominated at the Buzz Teeniez Awards.

== Singles and promotion ==
The album had three singles released as a build up to the album. Yenze Aliko, a song released in 2017 was the first release off the album. The single saw Flex D'Paper win the Song of the year award at the MTN UG Hip Hop awards 2019 and also got nominated at the Hipipo Music Awards 2020 for the same single, Yenze Aliko.

In 2019, another single, Level Up was released and a year after, it went ahead to win the Video Of The Year award 2020 at the MTN UG Hiphop awards and also got nominated for the Hip Hop Song Of The Year award at the Hipipo Music Awards 2020

During 2020, Flex D'Paper released a collaboration with Ugandan singer and songwriter Shena Skies, titled Mbikwasagwe. The song went on to win music awards in 2021 as well as get nominated at various awards.

Before releasing the album, Flex D'Paper announced the release date for the Kampala Boy Album as 10 December 2021 as well as sharing the artwork and track list. Various media houses in Uganda talked about the announcement. This built anticipation for the release.

== Critical reception ==
Kampala Boy on its release on 10 December 2021, received favorable reviews for its diverse sound. The songs produced on the project range from Hip Hop to Afro Beat, Dancehall and EDM. The artists features include artists like A Pass Navio (rapper) Fik Fameica Keko as well as new acts and a Swae Lee guest appearance on the album intro. On the day of release, the album was trending on Ugandan Twitter and Flex D'paper shared the links on his socials.

Cheptegei, a song celebrating Ugandan athlete Joshua Cheptegei was one of the many highlights off the album. The song features Navio (rapper) Fik Fameica and Mozelo Kidz.

== Commercial performance ==
The album debuted on the Apple Music ITunes Charts all genres countdown at number 26 and later climbed to number 3 on the same day. Within one week of release, Kampala Boy had made it to several notable streaming apps charts including deezer and Audiomack.

== Awards ==
The album won the 2023 UG Hip Hop Awards 2023 Album of the year award.

== Track listing ==
Kampala Boy track listing
No.	Title	Writer(s)	Producer(s)	Length
1.	"Swae Lee intro"	Khalif Malik Ibn Shaman Brown	Icon Studios	0.10
2.	"Cheptegei" (featuring Navio, Fik Fameica and Mozelo kidz)	Kwesigabo Alex Julius, Daniel Lubwama Kigozi, Walukagga Shafik, Mozelo	Mio Made	5:54
3.	"Not My Friends" (featuring A Pass)	Kwesigabo Alex Julius, Alexander Bagonza	Sam Lamara	2:46
4.	"Nkola Mpya" (featuring Keko)	Kwesigabo Alex Julius, Jocelyn Tracey	Aethan	2:39
5.	"Mbikwasagwe" (featuring Shena Skies)	Kwesigabo Alex, Namagembe Sheena	Aethan	2:41
6.	"Mandem"	Kwesigabo Alex	Mio Made, Baru Beats	2:43
7.	"Kampala Boy" (A Poem by Wake)	Kwesigabo Alex, Mugoda Gordons	Wake the Poet	4:04
8.	"Geez" (featuring Kemishan)	Kwesigabo Alex, Lukwiya Mark	Bad Chwezi	3:05
9.	"Yenze Aliko" (Lucian EDM Remix)	Kwesigabo Alex	Lucas Sivette	4:00
10.	"Level Up"	Kwesigabo Alex	Mio Made	3:11
11.	"Location" (featuring Mio Made)	Kwesigabo Alex, Rwothmio Samuel	Mio Made	3:18
12.	"Kamali"	Kwesigabo Alex, Namagembe Sheena, Nessim Mukiza	Nessim Pan Production	3:10
13.	"Loose Driver" (featuring Lagum the rapper)	Kwesigabo Alex, Lagum Owor	Lagum the rapper	3:19
14.	"Yenze Aliko"	Kwesigabo Alex	Mio Made	3:39
Total length:				45:00
