= Silent Depression =

Silent Depression is a Ugandan short film about a 20-year-old guy that feels like he is hit by a midlife crisis and decides to embark on a journey of self-discovery in a crowded city. It is the second film produced by George Stanley Nsamba under The Ghetto Film Project in 2015. The film was premiered on 16 June 2015 at the Uganda National Cultural Center to a record breaking crowd and has since become one of the most popular short film in Uganda.

The film was written, directed and produced by George Stanley Nsamba and features Ugandan rapper Malcolm Kawooya who plays the enigma till the last minute of the film. He also did the spoken-word narration in the film with the music by Tsabo D Middletonson from Urban Aksent music which features a song from Brian Corpus' 7 track EP still in production. The song is the second off his EP to have featured in The Ghetto Film Projects short films the first having been Stay in CRAFTS:The Value Of Life. The film also feature 5 other rappers including St. Nelly-sade, a lawyer, professional model and Miss Uganda finalist, Immaculate Ijang among others.

== Plot ==
A 20-year-old guy that feels like he is hit by a midlife crisis and decides to embark on a journey of self-discovery in a crowded city

== Production ==
The production of the film started on 10 May 2015 with the original title for the film called Act Of Humanity but was later changed to Silent Depression during production because of the change in plot. Originally the story centered around how we have created social classes amongst ourselves and gave away humanity but as Nsamba shot the film he lost his friend Obobo who was murdered which led him into depression hence the change in plot.

The film was shot with a production budget of about $15 in a period of 3 weeks shooting 2 days a week. It was done based on teamwork at the project where every member of The Ghetto Film Project offered their expertise free of charge. The production value of the film is $2500. After the premier, the film was released on YouTube on 20 June 2015 and Vimeo on 21 June 2015
