= Not for Sale =

Not 4 Sale or Not for Sale may refer to:

== Music ==
Albums:

- Not For Sale (mixtape), by Flex D'Paper, 2017
- Not 4 Sale (Sammy Hagar album), 2002
- Not 4 Sale (Kardinal Offishall album), 2008

Songs:

- "Not for Sale" (song), by Stacy, 2015
- "Not for Sale", song by Ruslana from her 2008 album Wild Energy
- "Not for Sale", song by Ernie Smith, 1969
- "Not for Sale", song by Ken Boothe, 1973

== Other ==
- Not For Sale (organization), a global nonprofit combating human trafficking, founded 2007
- Not for Sale (film), a 1924 silent film
- "Not For Sale", a poem by Patience Strong
