= Desire Luzinda =

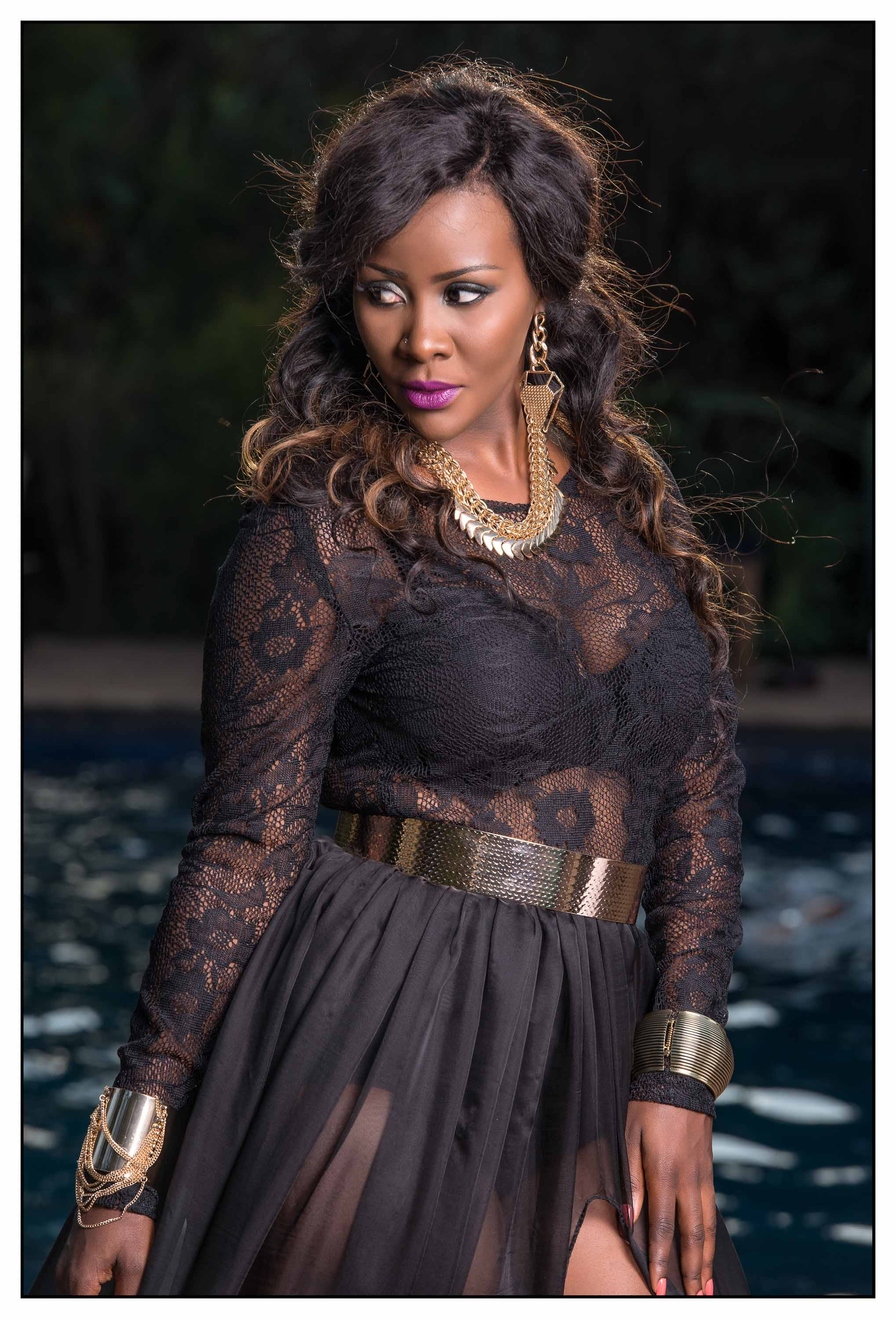
- Desire Luzinda

Background information
- Born: Desire Luzinda; 15 August 1984 (age 42); Ibanda, Uganda
- Origin: Uganda
- Genre: Pop
- Occupations: Singer, songwriter, musician
- Website: https://www.desireluzindafoundation.org/

Desire Luzinda (born 15 August 1984) is a Ugandan recording, performing artist, philanthropist, and founder of Desire Luzinda Foundation International (DLFI) established on 5 June 2021.

Luzinda often cited Mariah Carey and Whitney Houston as her inspirations in singing. Luzinda sings in Luganda, English, and Swahili.

== Early life and education ==
Luzinda was born in Mulago hospital and was raised in Ibanda district, Western Uganda by her mother along side her six siblings after which her mother moved back to Kampala.She completed her primary seven from Buganda Road Primary School and she went for her secondary school to Omega College and Makerere High School.

== Personal life ==
Luzinda to Mr and Mrs Luzinda, Her father was a teacher at King's college, Buddo and later he became cabinet minister during the regime of the president emeritus Idi Amin. She has six siblings and one daughter Michelle Heather Kaddu who she got from her previous relationship with Micheal Kaddu.She is married to gospel singer Levixone.

== Challenges ==
On 11 November 2014, Desire Luzinda was interviewed by BBC’s Ugandan correspondent, Catherine Byaruhanga following a scandal where her estranged boyfriend leaked her private pictures.
