= Enygma =

- Also known as: I-Am Enygma
- Born: I-Am Enygma; 1 February 1980 (age 46); Kampala, Uganda
- Genre: Hip-Hop
- Occupations: Rapper, producer, songwriter
- Instrument: Vocals
- Years active: 2010–present
- Label: Klarity Records
- Website: iamenygma.wordpress.com

I-Am Enygma (born 1 February 1980), better known by his stage name Enygma, is a Ugandan rapper, record producer, executive producer and entrepreneur known for his wordplay laced rhymes and always wearing a mask on his face so as to conceal his identity. He rose to fame in December 2010 following the runaway success of his single, Hustler's Night featuring The mith, Keko and Navio. This was followed up by even more celebrated hits in 2011, namely F.U.M.E.M.E. and Ten Reasons. He also represents one third of occasional rap group Klarity alongside The Mith and Lyrikal Proof. Also frequently collaborates with other artists such as Ruyonga, Maurice Kirya and Lyrical G. As an entrepreneur, Enygma conducts private business, mostly outside of the entertainment industry.

Enygma developed an interest in hip hop after hearing it on popular radio and TV channels as a child from popular rap songs that had cracked the mainstream. He was impressed that he had found a musical genre that matched his love for creative poetry developed in school. Enygma eventually began to memorise all of his favourite rap verses and by the time he completed secondary school had developed a reputation amongst his peers as a fierce and competitive battle MC and regularly performed at school parties. He teamed up with his cousin, producer Vince Vaider, to put together an album in 2001, but technical difficulties got in the way and Enygma promptly retired from rapping to focus on University education.

Several years later, Enygma began writing again which in June 2011 culminated in the critically acclaimed Enygma of the State mixtape. This resulted in Enygma receiving two Buzz Teeniez Awards Nominations (Top Hood Rapper and Breakthrough Artist) in 2012. This was followed by two more mixtapes, namely, Maskerade in December 2012 (with another Buzz Teeniez Awards Nomination for Top Hood Rapper) and The Enygma Machine in December 2014.

Enygma is also noted for his trademark mask, which he wears whenever he makes a public appearance, including performances and music videos.

== Life and career ==
=== Early life ===
Enygma was born in Kampala, Uganda but spent his childhood in London, England. He was raised on African and Islamic values which contributed to his teetotal lifestyle. His parents also valued education very much and encouraged Enygma's proclivity for reading books from as young as four years old. As soon as he started school, he became a champion at spelling bees and had excellent relationships with his English teachers who recognised his natural affinity for the written word. This opened the doors to Enygma's love for poetry reading and writing. He also joined music clubs and at various points played piano, xylophone, steel drums, trumpet and double bass. He played these instruments at school assemblies and also performed poetry recitals and acted in plays.

In 1989, Vanilla Ice had a worldwide smash hit with Ice Ice Baby and it was just as popular in London as anywhere else. Young Enygma had never ever heard music that was so heavily reliant on lyrics like that before and a young African living in London had a most unlikely introduction to the artform that is rapping. Enygma memorised all the lyrics and did the same for MC Hammer's U Can't Touch This and Will Smith's theme song to The Fresh Prince of Bel-Air. in 1991, 11-year-old rapping duo Kris Kross emerged on the scene and because these boys looked like him (particularly the late Mac Daddy), Enygma felt encouraged that the craft was not inaccessible to little boys such as himself. Over the next decade, he collected music by 2pac, Notorious BIG, Jay-Z, Nas, Eminem, Xzibit, DMX, Busta Rhymes, Naughty By Nature, Warren G, Will Smith, Lil Kim, Missy Elliot and Rakim. In 1997, Mase released 24 Hours To Live featuring the Lox, Black Rob and DMX in one of the most explosive posse cuts at that time. This inspired Enygma, after years of writing poems, to pen his first rap bars. In 2001 during his Senior 6 vacation in London, he wrote an album intending to record with his producer and cousin, Vince Vaider. But as fate would have it, Vaider's computer malfunctioned and was unable to provide the instrumentals as planned. Enygma's laptop also crashed, causing him to lose all the lyrics he had written for his album. This led Enygma to abandon rapping as he was beginning University life and aside from performing at one campus show a year, did not have time to pursue it as a craft. He did however meet GNL Zamba, Wordstorm, Navio, The Mith and Langman during his University days. Relationships that would later prove instrumental to his career, although he did not this at the time.

=== Career beginnings ===
After University, Enygma only remained involved in hip-hop as an observer and began a career in the corporate world, completely uninvolved in the music industry. At one corporate event, he loosened his tie and got on a microphone and started rapping to his stunned audience. This led to Enygma reconnecting with an old acquaintance from his days as a student called Jay Kay. Jay Kay had an audio editing suite and was recording songs on his laptop with three other friends (Junny, D.M. Dub and Plan Mbi) and they called themselves Da Posse. Enygma was invited to join the group since they all had two things in common, they all had corporate jobs and they loved to rap. When Da Posse were not recording songs on computers with Skype mics, they were having freestyle cyphers or battling each other, with the aim of sharpening their lyrical prowess. After recording the song Kampala City, it was decided that it was time to find a real studio and get some professional recording done. This led the group to Hannz Records in November 2009 where Kampala City was recorded afresh. Hannz and Enygma realised they had good chemistry and agreed to work on more projects together in the immediate future.

=== Enygma of the State ===
In 2010, Enygma began his active music career. He had decided to work on one album and retire immediately thereafter. The album was to be called Enygma of the State. The title came from a Lupe Fiasco mixtape called Enemy of the State which also happens to be the title of one of his favourite Will Smith movies. This combined one of Enygma's influences from when he first became aware of rap, and one of his influences during present day and the album would be a culmination of everything he has done in between. Interchanging the word "Enemy" with the name "Enygma" also represents the dichotomy at the centre of Enygma's persona. He can be both light and dark depending on how you choose to interpret him, hence making him truly Enygmatic. When the album was completed, Enygma felt like he had learnt so much about being a recording artist while making it and that there was still even more for him to learn. He decided that he would hold off retirement until he had seen how much more he could grow as an artist and reclassified Enygma of the State from an album to a mixtape and released it in June 2011. Along the way, Enygma's reputation continued to grow.

The lead single off the mixtape was Hustler's Night featuring The Mith, Keko and Navio which went down as one of Ugandan hip-hop's all-time classic tracks. It was premiered on Hot 100 and the music video enjoyed plenty of rotation on Africa's premier music video station, Channel O.

=== Maskerade ===
Because Enygma of the State was an accidental mixtape, Enygma wanted to immediately get to work making a mixtape deliberately. His hip-hop education taught him that mixtapes were always full of cover beats, instrumentals from popular hits that the artist in question wanted to tackle and give a new interpretation. And so Enygma went ahead to squeeze in as many covers as he felt reasonable into this project. And because the beats belonged to other artists, he was in effect masquerading on those beats, hence the title Maskerade (December 2012). The concept was unappreciated by many and the project split opinions of Ugandan hip-hop lovers. Nonetheless, F.U.M.E.M.E. (a vent session lamenting the problems of frequent power outages in Kampala, recorded on the Instrumental of Kanye West's All of the Lights) became Enygma's most downloaded song of all time and spread Enygma's popularity to stations that do not traditionally give much airtime to Ugandan hip-hop.

=== Possebility ===
While Enygma was putting together Enygma of the State and Maskerade, he was still meeting up with the members of his group Da Posse and occasionally recording more material. The title Possebility was selected as a triumph of passion over circumstance. With everybody working full-time in their corporate careers, gathering all members together consistently enough to record enough songs for a mixtape was a difficult challenge but not impossible. Possebility was released in 2013.

=== The Enygma Machine ===
The initial plan was that Enygma's long-anticipated album Enygmatic would be released in 2014. However, he was feeling burnt out after recording for 3 years non-stop and so spent most of 2014 on holiday from the studio. Fortunately though, his relentless work ethic meant that there was another mixtape in the vault and so there was a project available for release to tide over his audience until the album is ready. The Enygma Machine was released in December 2014.

=== Performances ===
- 2011: Navio Nawuliranga Concert
- 2012: Kwivuga.
- 2012: Mun*G Champion Concert.
- 2012: The Mith Nine2Eleven.
- 2013: Ruyonga Victory Music Concert.
- 2013: Myko Ouma Season II Concert.
- 2014: Benezeri Champion Concert.
- 2014: Bayimba Festival.
- 2014: Navio Daytime Concert.

== Lyrical style ==
Enygma has been credited for popularising the use of punchlines in Ugandan hip-hop and remains a trademark that he is known for. Nonetheless, Enygma employs various lyrical techniques in his songwriting, using both metaphors and literal statements in his work. Most of all though, he enjoys demonstrating wordplay at every opportunity and this has helped place him at the high table with the rest Ugandan hip-hop's elite.

== Personal life ==
=== Religion ===
Enygma has demonstrated on social media as well as discussed on various radio interviews that he is a Muslim, and that Islam is an important part of his life. In 2013, Enygma released a song called Fast Track which details the experience of a Muslim fasting during the holy month of Ramadhan.

=== Other interests ===
Enygma deliberately reveals very little of his personal life. But it is known that his other interests include football, technology, extensive reading and speaking out against corruption. He also has a line of T-shirts distributed through def.i.ni.tion.

== Discography ==
=== Solo albums ===
- 2015: Enygmatic

=== Mixtapes ===
- 2011: Enygma of the State
- 2012: Maskerade
- 2014: The Enygma Machine
- 2015: Mask-King-Tape

=== With Da Posse ===
- 2013: Possebility

== Awards and recognition ==
In 2012, Enygma was nominated for Breakthrough Artist and Top Hood Rapper at the Buzz Teeniez Awards. In the same year he was part of a collective that received a nomination for the single Competition is Dead at the Pearl of Africa Music Awards. In 2013, Enygma was once again nominated for Top Hood Rapper at the Buzz Teeniez Awards. Considered among the most influential rappers in Uganda.
