= Justine Nabbosa =

Ugandan gospel singer and pastor

- Born: Kamuli District, Eastern Uganda
- Education: Makerere University
- Occupations: Gospel artist and pastor
- Notable work: president of Next Girl Champion
- Spouse: Jonathan Muwaganya
- Children: one
- Awards: victoria Gospel Agency-2016 Royal Gospel Music -2024

Justine Nabbosa is a Ugandan gospel artist and a co-pastor with Wilson Bugembe at Worship house, Nansana. She is best known for her 2016 album, Oli Katonda.

== Background and education ==
Nabbosa was born in Kamuli, Eastern Uganda; the ninth child of James and Tappi Kiyingi. She graduated from Makerere University with a bachelor's degree in organizational and industrial psychology.

== Singing career ==
Nabbosa's father was a pastor, so she grew up teaching Sunday school classes, singing in the choir and leading school fellowships. She started her music career as a backing singer for Wilson Bugembe. On April 24, 2017, Nabbosa held her first solo concert, and since then has used her singing to preach through music. She is president of Next Girl Champion, an annual conference that empowers girls and women in Uganda.

== Discography ==
Nabossa has released the following songs:

- Oli katonda
- Hossana
- Kumpi Nawe
- Yansumulula
- Mulamu
- Webale Kunjagala
- Ekitibwa
- Tewali Akufanana
- Nkwagala Nnyo
- Bibyo
- Onewunyisa

== Awards ==
In 2016, Nabbosa won the album of the year in the VIGA (Victoria Gospel Agency) awards with Oli Katonda. In 2021, she won best praise song at the Royal Gospel music awards.

Nabbosa was nominated as Best Female Artiste for the Royal Gospel music awards 2024.

== Personal life ==
Nabbosa is married to Jonathan Muwaganya, and they have one child.
