= Grace Lubega =

Ugandan Pentecostal pastor and founder of Phaneroo Ministries

Grace Lubega Matovu Apostle
- General Overseer
- Apostle Grace Lubega ministering at the Phaneroo 11th Anniversary Celebrations
- Church: Phaneroo Ministries International

Personal details
- Born: Wakiso District, Uganda
- Denomination: Born-again Christian
- Occupation: Pastor, Singer-songwriter, Business Man
- Profession: Former Banker
- Education: Bachelor's degree in Social Work and Social Administration, Uganda Christian University; Honorary Doctorate of Divinity, Zoe Life Theological College

Grace Lubega Matovu is a Ugandan Pentecostal Christian leader, singer, former banker and the founder of Phaneroo Ministries International, an evangelical ministry based in Kampala. He is known for weekly teaching and evangelism meetings, large open-air services, and media broadcasts that reach audiences in Uganda and abroad .

== Background and education ==
Apostle Grace was born to a Roman Catholic family but to being Born again at age eight at a crusade. He studied Social Work and Social Administration (SWASA) at Uganda Christian University. He received an honorary Doctorate of Divinity in February 2023 by Zoe Life Theological College, a theological college located in the United States, for his ministry and spiritual leadership service. However, the college is known as a diploma mill.

== Career ==
Before committing himself fully to Christian ministry, Grace Lubega worked in the corporate world as a Customer Care Supervisor at Kenya Commercial Bank (KCB). His work was dealing with customer service operations and client relations. Lubega later quit working at KCB around the years 2016-2018 to devote himself to fully devote his time to Phaneroo Ministries International.

== Ministry leadership ==
Lubega started Phaneroo Ministries International in 2014. The ministry started with mid-week worship held on Thursdays before incorporating Sunday services. It claims regular discipleship, outreach programs, and various venue services in Kampala. Top Ugandan dailies have featured Phaneroo's anniversary and growth. Phaneroo previously held large New Year and anniversary services, including events at Kampala public grounds like Kololo and UMA Show Grounds. Phaneroo acquired a new site of around 4.5 acres in Naguru which has been officially dedicated for church services and events where they recently hosted the New Year prayers for 2024 and the 10th and 11th anniversary celebrations. Apostle Grace recently declared during a service about plans to build a $55 million (UGX 202 billion) mega church in Naguru Kampala, Uganda, declaring that the project will proceed without loans or public donations, this attracted criticism from a number of social media influencers who questioned the source of funding for this project. The development of this site is a significant step in the ministry's growth and its commitment to serving its fast-growing congregation that its in tens of thousands. The Naguru site accommodates over 20,000 believers every Sundays and Thursdays, who stream into the grounds whether it rains or shines. This is more of a spiritual revival than a church service, as hundreds of followers follow the live services through Manifest TV, radio and Phaneroo social media platforms world wide. Apostle Grace Lubega is known worldwide for his teachings on revelation and revival, and he preaches in various countries around the world.

== Personal life ==
Grace Lubega is wedded to Nicole Kavuma Lubega, daughter of Ugandan businessperson Dennis Paul Kavuma. They were wedded on 19 March 2019 in a wedding that took place at Lake Victoria Serena Hotel in Kigo. They have a daughter whom they gave birth to in 2020. Nicole appears in public ministry on very few occasions with her husband, but otherwise leads a secretive life.

== Songs ==
1. Yesu Ndi Wuwo [New Testament ft. Apostle Grace Lubega]

2. Jesu [Dunsin Oyekan ft. Apostle Grace Lubega] 3. Worship My King [Moses Bliss ft. Apostle Grace Lubega]

The other songs attributed to him are covers of the originals.

== See also ==
- Phaneroo Ministries International
- Christianity in Uganda
- Pentecostalism
