= Bataka Squad =

Ugandan music group

Bataka Squad (formerly Bataka Underground) is a Ugandan hip hop group. The group was formed by Babaluku (a.k.a. Sniperous MC), Saba Saba aka Krazy Native and Big Poppa Momo MC. Founded in the mid-1990s, it is one of the earliest hip hop groups in Uganda.

The group was later joined by Newton now in L.A, La raat now in London, UK, Lyrical G who later joined Urban Thugs and eventually went solo. Chagga who left and joined Chameleone as a background vocalist. Then came Shillingz who was known for his tongue twisting and now based in Toronto, Canada. Then came "Farious" a Burundian born who also returned home. Currently, Saba Saba, Babaluku and new member Tshila are holding it down as Bataka Squad.

The word 'Bataka' means natives. Members wanted people to understand their background. The three founders were born and raised in Kampala, Uganda. The term Underground was meant to imply simply "Not Commercial". Bataka Underground began with the intention of letting Ugandans know that they are living in a new age.

They are working on a compilation CD intended to be released in 2007

In 2006, the group performed at the inaugural Trinity International Hip Hop Festival in Hartford, United States.

The group is also the subject of the Diamonds in the Rough: A Ugandan Hip Hop Revolution documentary.

== Awards ==
- 2007 Pearl of Africa Music Awards (PAM Awards) - Best Hip Hop Single ("Utake Anthem")
