= Crafts: The Value of Life =

- Directed by: George Stanley Nsamba
- Written by: George Stanley Nsamba
- Produced by: George Stanley Nsamba
- Starring: Kawooya Malcolm; Aber Patience; Uzabumwana Sharif
- Cinematography: George Stanley Nsamba
- Edited by: George Stanley Nsamba
- Music by: Tsabo D. Middletonson; Lawrance Balayo
- Production company: The Ghetto Film Project
- Distributed by: Nes Motion Media
- Release date: February 27, 2015 (Ugandan)
- Running time: 7 minutes
- Country: Uganda
- Language: English
- Budget: $10

Crafts: The Value of Life is a black and white Ugandan short film written, directed, and produced by George Stanley Nsamba as his debut film project. Prior to its release on DVD, the film debuted February 10, 2015, at the Uganda National Cultural Center, breaking the attendance record for a short film premiere at the Ugandan National Theatre before Nsamba's film titled Silent Depression later broke his own record.

== Plot ==
19-year-old Shafi (Uzabumwana Sharif) meets up with Pesh (Aber Patience) to address their relationship problems but the crafts he picks up on his way become a focal point of discussion as he is reprimanded for his childish behavior.

== Production ==
Crafts was originally shot with no intention. After a meeting with his documentary team at the Uganda National Cultural Center attended by his photography student Sharif Uzabumwana, George Stanley Nsamba decided to put him to the task of with a short film idea to be executed right away. Uzabumwana then took Nsamba's crafts and made a picture in black and white and put his mentor to task. Right it the same spot, Nsamba took a couple of shots with the crafts and directed Uzabumwana on the actions he wanted and by next day he had made a few scenes he in-cooperated in his works to make a demo reel which circulated mainly over WhatsApp.

Allie Mutaka the president of Film Club later requested that a film be made out of that material which led to the making of CRAFTS:The Value Of Life a months later starring Sharif Uzabumwana himself in the lead role alongside rapper Malcolm Kawooya aka Malx and first time actress Patience Aber alongside street kids under The Ghetto Film Project.

Apart from Malcolm Kawooya, the cast were first time actors who had no prior experience. Initially a homeless child called Mujapani was to act in the movie but it was later preferred that the 6 year old Elizabeth Che and her mother who were homeless at that time take up the role. The movie shooting was done for close to two weeks, twice each week and cost around $10 to produce though project value is $1800.

== Cast ==
- Kawooya Malcolm (aka MalX)
- Aber Patience
- Uzabumwana Sharif
- Elizabeth Che
- Afzar Shambe
- Angella Amate
- Roy Cwinytado
