= Phaneroo Ministries International =

Organisation

- Phaneroo Ministries International
- Location: Kampala
- Country: Uganda
- Denomination: Evangelical Christian, Neopentecostal
- Website: https://phaneroo.org/

History
- Status: Active
- Founded: August 7, 2014
- Founder: Apostle Grace Lubega
- Events: The Anniversary Celebrations Night of Prayer (31st December Crossover) Men Gather Conference My Great Price Conference The Global Inter-University Conference The Inter Schools Conference

Phaneroo Ministries International is a Christian ministry headquartered in Kampala, Uganda, known for its dynamic approach to evangelism and discipleship. Founded in 2014 by Apostle Grace Lubega. The word "Phaneroo" is derived from the Greek language, meaning "to make manifest," reflecting the ministry's mission to reveal the power of God in the lives of believers.

== Vision and Mission ==
Phaneroo Ministries International is driven by a vision to transform nations through the preaching of the gospel and to raise a generation of believers who walk in the full knowledge and manifestation of the Word of God. The ministry dedicates to equipe believers with biblical teachings that empower them to live victorious Christian lives and to influence society positively.

The ministry's mission is centered around the core values of love, faith, and the power of the Holy Spirit. Through its various programs and initiatives, the ministry aims to nurture a deeper understanding of the Scriptures, foster spiritual growth, and cultivate a personal relationship with Jesus Christ among its followers.

== Programs and Activities ==
Phaneroo Ministries International has fellowship gatherings, which attract thousands of attendees from different parts of Uganda and other countries. These fellowships are characterized by worship, in-depth Bible teaching, and reported manifestations of the Holy Spirit, including healings and miracles.

The ministry also conducts large-scale evangelistic crusades, both within Uganda and internationally, to share the message of the gospel. Phaneroo's outreach programs extended to various sectors of society, including educational institutions, prisons, and hospitals, where the ministry provided and still provides spiritual guidance, counselling, and humanitarian aid.

In addition to its physical gatherings, Phaneroo's teachings and sermons are broadcast through social media, and podcasts.

== Leadership ==
Phaneroo Ministries International is led by Apostle Grace Lubega.

== Impact and Influence ==
Since its inception, Phaneroo Ministries International has played a role in leading individuals to Christ and in fostering spiritual renewal across the nation. Youth form a large part of its congregation.

Phaneroo engages in community development projects, including education, healthcare, and poverty alleviation initiatives.

== Guinness World Record ==
On 30 July 2023, Phaneroo led an event called “Clap for Jesus” in Kampala that set the Guinness World Record for the longest applause at 3 hours 16 minutes 1 second, with 926 participants. The goal of the exercise was to show their gratitude to Jesus in a unique way not done by anyone yet. The achievement was confirmed by Guinness World Records and reported by international and Ugandan media.

== Controversies and Criticism ==
Some detractors have questioned its teachings and the emphasis on miracles and prosperity. However, the ministry maintained that its doctrine is biblically sound and that the manifestations of the Holy Spirit are a testament to God's power. Followers have defended the ministry's practices and teachings up to present.
