= Ruyonga =

- Born: Uganda
- Occupation: Rapper
- Musical career
- Genres: Hip hop; Gospel
- Years active: 2000–present
- Label: Kinetic Management
- Website: ruyonga.com

Edwin Ruyonga, known by the mononym Ruyonga is a Ugandan hip hop and spoken-word musical artist based in the United States. Ruyonga was one of the pioneering hip-hop acts in Uganda, with his first group winning a nationwide music competition in 2000.

Rawkus Records selected Ruyonga as one of the top 50 artists on the internet, and Rawkus helped release his second solo album, AFRiCAN, in 2007. Ruyonga has recorded songs with many artists including Brother Ali and Slug of Atmosphere, and has shared the stage with Lupe Fiasco, K’Naan, Wu Tang Clan, Grieves and Budo (Rhymesayers) and The Roots.

Ruyonga is married to Sheila Yvonne Agaba with whom he has a daughter. In 2013, he was on DSTV's list African MC's: In a League of their own. He has collaborated with fellow Ugandan rappers like The mith,Navio Bigtril, and Zex Bilangilangi. He is also credited for delivering the finest verses in Ugandan cyphers, notably Vuqa cypher.

== Music ==
Ruyonga is both a gospel and secular rapper. He has worked with artists like JGivens, Magg 44, Enygma, Benezeri, Big Tril, Maurice Kirya, Zex Bilangilangi, Rickman Manrick, Ykee Benda, and Don MC. Ruyonga was previously known as Krukid, member of the hip-hop trio A.R.M. (African Rebel Movement/Artists Representing the Motherland), which also included M.anifest (Ghana) and Budo.

He was included in the 2007 Rawkus 50, a list compiled by Rawkus Records of 50 notable hip hop artists. He recorded the soundtrack for Nana Kagga's 2012 film, The Life. In 2022, he teamed up with rising Stars 1 Der Jr and Zex Bilangilangi and did a hip-hop banger Parte Yaani.

== Discography ==
=== Albums ===
- Gloryfire (2015)
- Kabalega (2024)

=== Singles ===
- Remant Revolution (2018)
- Saala, ft. Ykee Benda (2019)
- Jim, ft. Zoe Star (2021)
- No Job! (2021)
- Muliro, ft. Coopy Bly (2022)
- Parte Yani, ft. Wonder Jr, ZEX BILANGILANGI (2022)
- Akamuli, ft. Ray G (2024)

== See also ==
- Levixone
- Wilson Bugembe
- Betty Nakibuuka
- Coopy Bly
