= Deborah Nantongo Cleave =

- Born: Deborah Nantongo; Uganda
- Other name: MamiDeb
- Education: Kingston University (LLB)
- Occupations: Reality TV star, entrepreneur, socialite
- Known for: Lead cast member on Kampala Crème
- Spouse: Michael Cleave (m. 2024)

Deborah Nantongo Cleave (real name Deborah Nantongo), commonly known as MamiDeb, is a Ugandan reality TV star, entrepreneur, and socialite.

== Personal life and education ==
MamiDeb was born in Uganda but spent 25 years in the United Kingdom, where she earned a degree in Law from Kingston University before returning to Uganda. MamiDeb is married to Michael Cleave, a British national. However, they became famous because of their age gap of 20 years and high-profile relationship. They held their traditional ceremony in Masulita located in Wakiso District and destination wedding in the Maldives on November 10, 2024 after meeting in a parking lot in Surrey, South East England. However, MamiDeb shared unexpected experience of meeting Michael's ex-wife, Louise who was married to him for 23 years. In December 2025, she underwent surgery to transform her body. In 2025 during her birthday, her husband, Michael Cleave gifted her a new Mercedes-Benz.

== Career journey ==
She was the lead cast member on the popular reality show "Kampala Crème", which chronicles the lives of Uganda's affluent social circles. She got the name MamiDeb which was a household name through Kampala Crème before her exit from the show in October 2025 to pursue new opportunities. She is the chief executive officer of Boujee Clothing Store and also does poultry farming. She signed a partnership with Showmax Uganda for their #ShowmaxNowNow campaign.
