= Betty Nakibuuka =

Ugandan gospel musician and songwriter (born 1975)

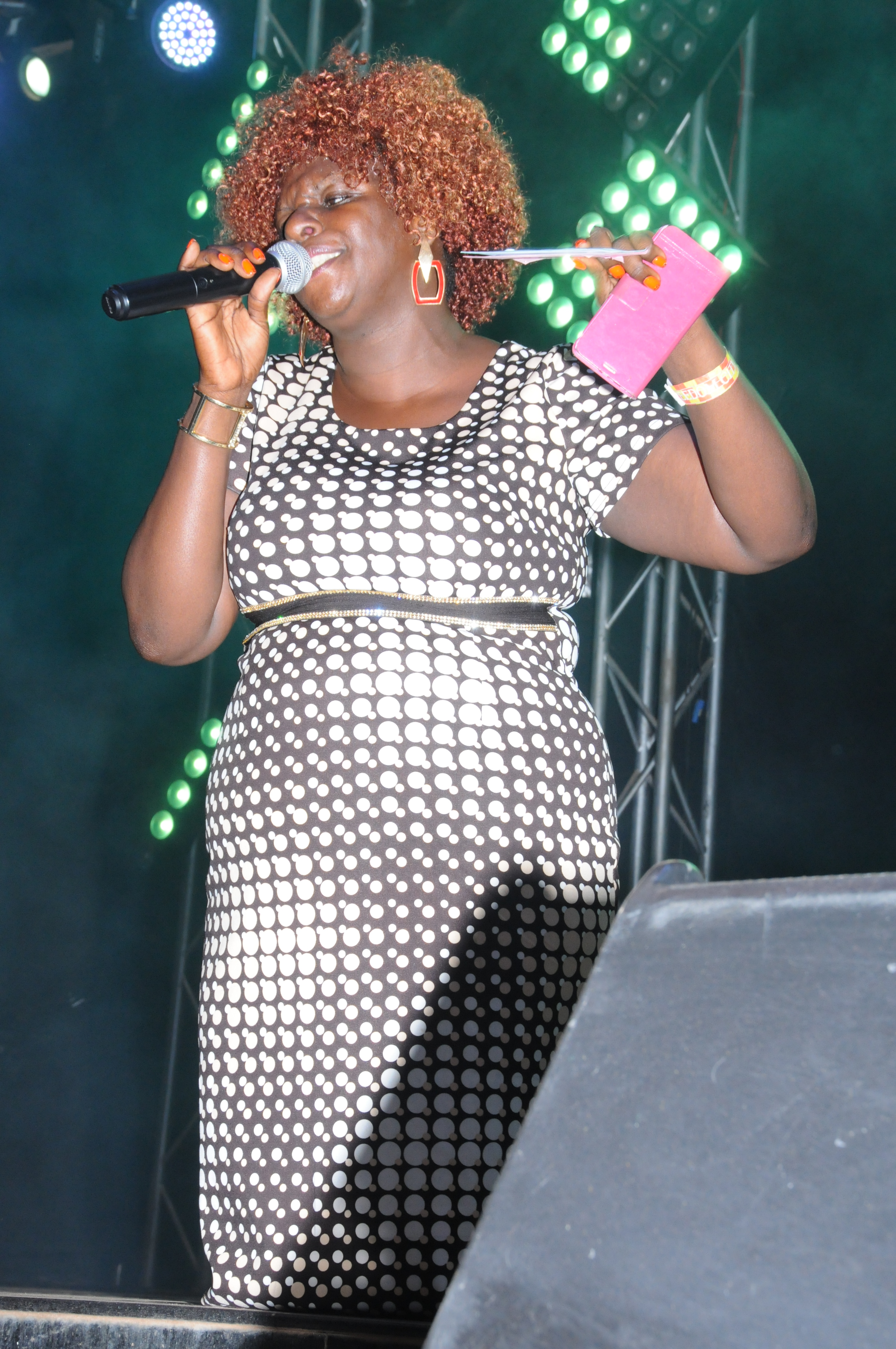
- Betty Nakibuka (2015)

Background information
- Also known as: Betty Nakibuuka Senyonjo
- Born: 1975 (age 50–51)
- Occupations: Musician, songwriter
- Spouse: John Senyonjo

Betty Nakibuuka also known as Betty Nakibuuka Senyonjo (born 1975) is a Ugandan gospel musician and songwriter. She is the mother of the gospel artist Gloria Mulungi, also known as Baby Gloria. Some of her most notable songs include 'Baddu ba Yesu', 'Tukutendereza', 'Luyimba lwange', and 'Munene Munene'. With a career spanning over two decades, she has established herself as a prominent figure in the Ugandan gospel music industry.

== Early life and career ==
Betty Nakibuuka was the eleventh of twelve siblings. At age 14, she began working after school with her mother, Rose Nakato, to sell second-hand garments to generate funds for educational expenses and necessities. When her mother began experiencing joint pain and swelling, Nakibuuka worked alone. In 1991, while carrying out her regular trade, Nakibuuka encountered preachers who convinced her to "entrust all her burdens to Jesus Christ the savior". Nakibuuka possessed a fondness for children from a young age, and became involved in the church's Sunday school. She began composing and recording songs with the children. She encountered an admiration for her singing talent, which paved the way for recording offers for her debut album. She ventured into musical endorsements for esteemed corporations like House of Manji, Silky Pads, and Britania.

== Discography ==
Some of her songs:

- Eby'Omuggulu
- Ntendereza
- Kangume
- Yesu Mulungi
- Kowoola
- Wali Wali
- Maama
- Nkomyewo
- Netaaga Gwe
- Abelawo
- Njagala Nkwagale
- Mu Musayi
- Amagenda Gange
- Yetiika
- Buddu Ba Yesu
- Webale Nyo Yesu
- Mutima Gwange Guma
- Mu Nusayi
- Amagenda Gange
- Tekutendereza
- Luyimba Lwange
- Munene Munene

== Personal life ==
Nakibuuka married John Senyonjo on 3 November 1999 at Full Gospel Church in Makerere. The couple has three children including the gospel artist Gloria Mulungi, also known as Baby Gloria.

== Nominations and awards ==
- 2004 Best Female Artist, TOP Radio National Music Awards
- 2010 Tumaini Musical Award
- 2011 The Olive Musical Award

== See also ==
- Baby Gloria
- Wilson Bugembe
- Gabie Ntaate
