= Brian Lubega =

Ugandan gospel singer

- Born: Brian Lubega; Uganda
- Origin: Uganda
- Genres: Gospel
- Occupations: Singer; Songwriter; Pastor
- Years active: 2011–present
- Label: Independent

Brian Lubega is a Ugandan gospel singer, songwriter, and pastor. He is known for his songs that are sung in Ugandan church services. Over the years, Brian has won several awards like the Royal Gospel Music Awards, Groove Awards and has shared stage with several renown artists like Don Moen.

== Early life and education ==
He started singing in 2003 while still in secondary school and was part of the church choir. In 2011, he became professionally a gospel singer.

== Career ==
Lubega began his music career as a volunteer for Youth for Christ ministries church during his Senior Six vacation. He later released his debut album, Nungamya, which was well received by the public. The album featured songs such as “Nungamya” and “Wegukubira” that became popular in Uganda and beyond. In 2018, Lubega released his second album, Wegukubira. The album featured songs such as “Ndiwuwe” and “Wegukubira” that received airplay on local radio stations and TVs. In 2016, Brian Lubega was ordained as a Pastor, combining his musical talents with his role as a spiritual leader.

== Discography ==
Albums

- Nungamya (2013)
- Wegukubira (2018)
- Olungiya (2022)

Songs

- Linda Yesu
- Nyanjala
- Onkoledde
- Bunyuma
- Teli Akusinga
- Victory
- Support
- Nesiimye
- Wakitiibwa
- Wegukubira
- Sitoma
- Nsiimye
- Takadiwa
- Olungiya
- Asaanide
- Mbaagala
- Nungamya
- Ndi Wuwe
- As a Church
- Kubayita
- Tankwatibwa Nsonyi
- Sijja Kowa
- Okoze
- Yazirwana
- Nungamya ntwala awo

== Awards and nominations ==
- 2019 Groove Awards Artist of the Year.

== See also ==
- James Kabuye
- Cyprian Kizito Lwanga
- Joseph Kiwanuka
