= St. Nelly-Sade =

Ugandan Lugaflow rapper

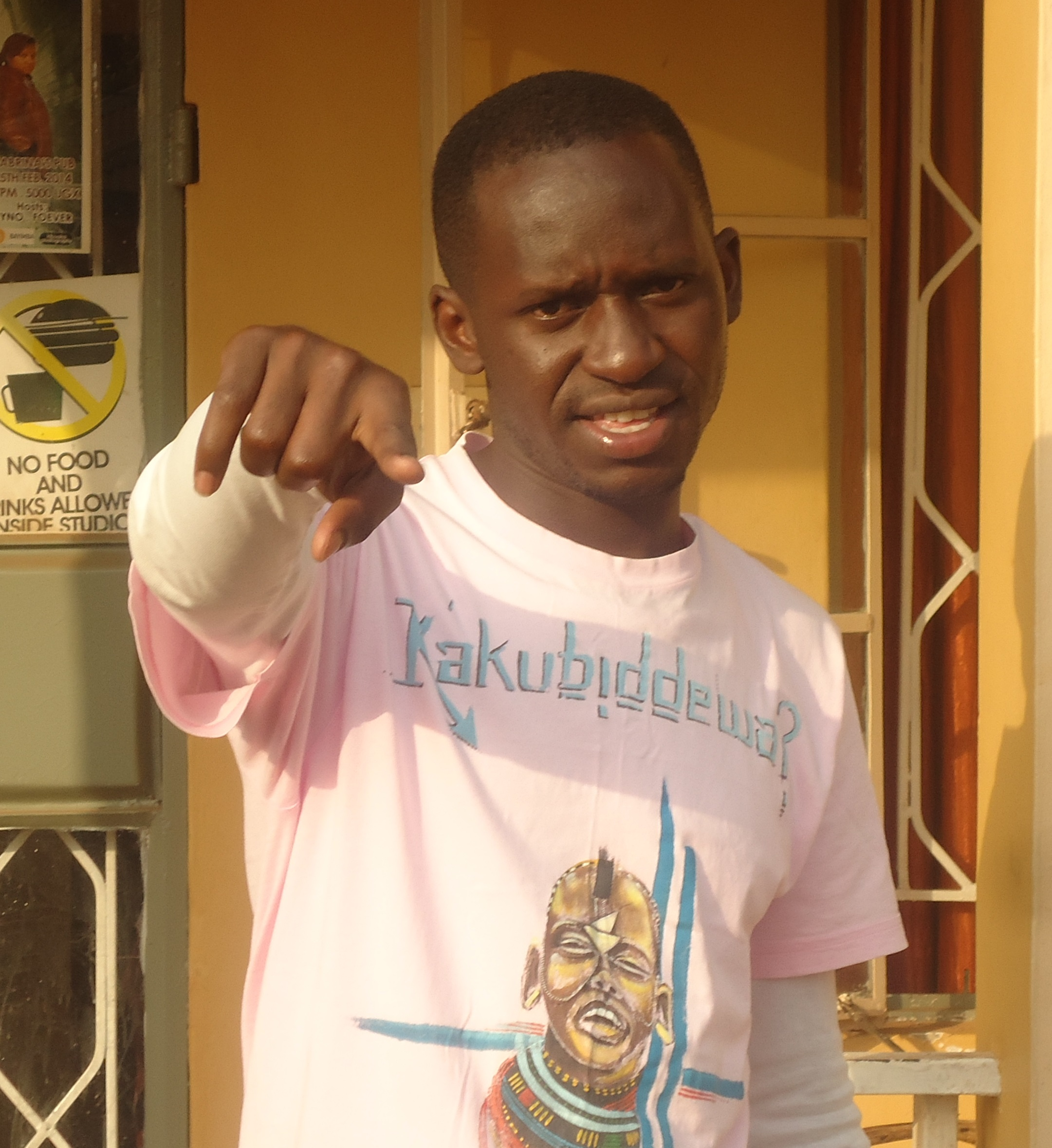
- Born: Nsubuga Nelson; 1988 (age 37–38); Uganda
- Occupation: musician

St. Nelly-Sade, born Nsubuga Nelson, is a Ugandan Lugaflow rapper. He has performed on national and international stages including Bayimba International Festival of the Arts, LaBa! Arts Festival, Uganda Hip Hop Summit, as well as performances in South Sudan, Arusha, Tanzania and in various regions all over east Africa.

Nelly-Sade has contributed to many projects such as The Hip Hop Canvas album 2009 and 2010, Voices Initiative Uganda, WAPI, Open Mic Night Kampala, End of the Weak Uganda, Spoken Truth and Mic Stand Hip Hop night, which he started in 2011. He was Co-coordinator for the End of the Weak International Hip Hop Festival held in Kampala in 2014.

== Early life and education ==
St. Nelly-Sade was born Nsubuga Nelson in 1988 in Kampala, to Lule Edward and Nantongo Jane. He attended Buganda Road Primary School and St. Joseph Primary school Nazigo for his primary education, and Old Kampala Secondary School and Yale High School for his secondary education. He proceeded to "Do it Virtual Institute" for a diploma in project planning and management.

== Music ==
Nelly-Sade started rapping in 2007. He formed his first rap group, The Hip Hop Gangstarz with a group of friends in 2004. The group broke up when they failed to find success. Nelly-Sade continued rapping in English but was not well received. In 2008, he recorded his first duet, My Lover with A.B Khale, which became a hit on local radio stations in the eastern region of Uganda. He took part in a number of Hip Hop battles organized by "Hot 100" including "Hip Hop Canvas", "End of the Weak Mic Challenge Uganda", and one on one battles organized in different areas of Kampala. He rapped in Luganda. In 2010, he joined "Bavubuka All Starz". Along with a few of his peers, they emerged from the foundation to form a platform for their future success as The Luga Flow Army.

He has had hit singles like "Tubaale", "Nina Plan", "Nzijukira", "Kakubiddewa", "Love story" and "Nva Ntinda" "Neighbour (kankuwaneko)". He has collaborated with A Pass, Keko, The Mith, Nutty Neithan, Ruyonga, Enygma and Annet Nandujja. He has future collaborations with Peter Miles,

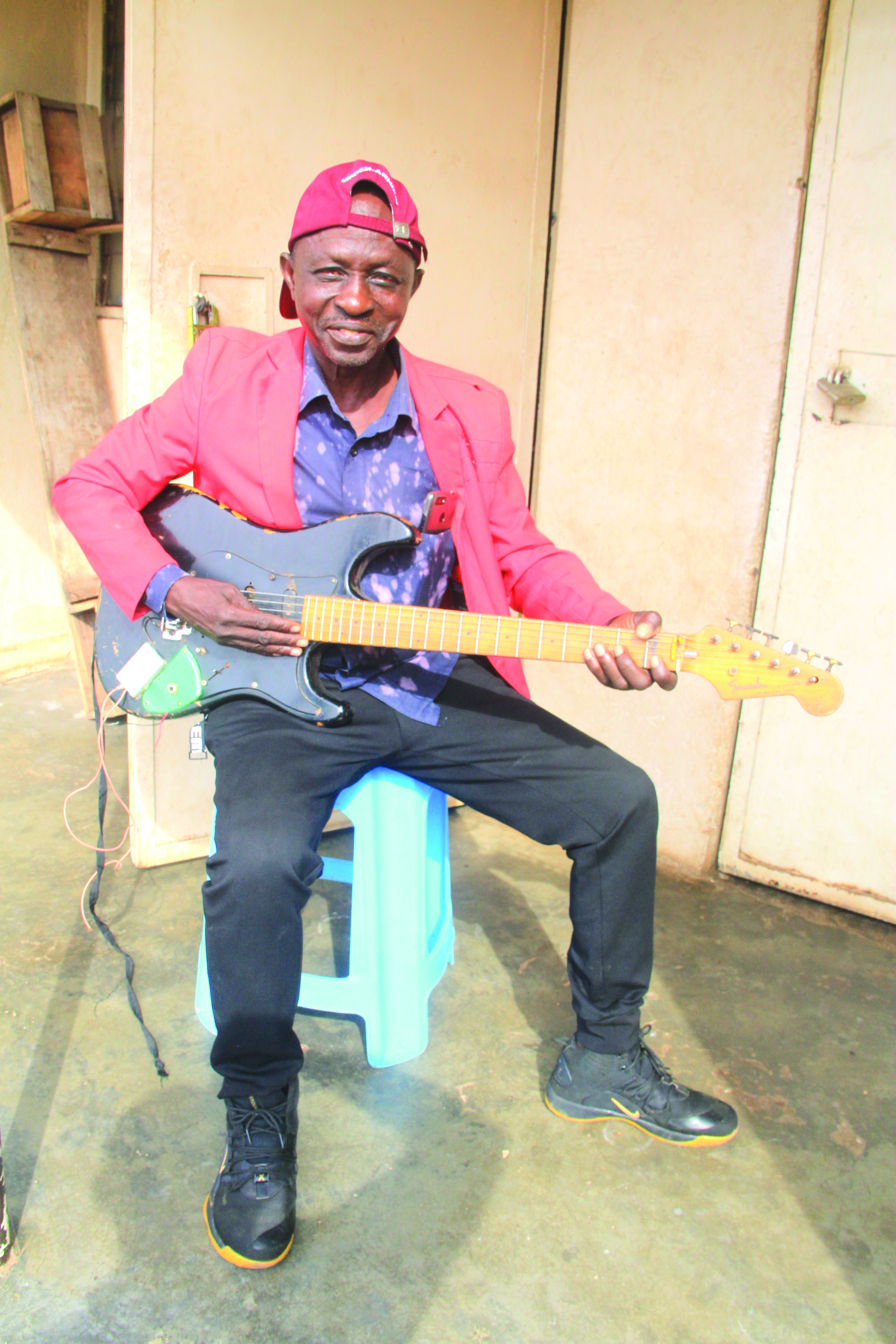
Willy Mukabya

Willy Mukaabya, Navio and Bana Mutibwa. He released his debut album "The translation (Okutaputa)" in 2013.

== Discography ==
- The translation (Okutaputa), 2013
- Omulondo N'engero (Stories of elevation), 2015
- Suicide note
- Nzijukira
- Nva ntinda
- Cant put me down
- Bonga nange
- Get ya hustle on
- Tubaale
- Amazigga ga namuddu
- love lead

== Awards and recognition ==
- Winner Album of the Year in UG HipHop Awards 2017
- Winner Lyricist of the year in MTN UG HipHop Awards 2019
- Nominated for Teeniez Hottest Hip hop song in Buzz Teens awards, 2014.
- Nominated for Best Luga flow artist in Rising Star awards.
