= Mac Elvis =

Ugandan gospel musician and producer

- Born: December 1, 1987; Uganda
- Died: October 18, 2013 (aged 25)
- Occupation: musician

Mac Elvis (born Mutalya Mark Elvis; December 1, 1987 - October 18, 2013)), was a Ugandan gospel musician and music producer. He drowned in a swimming pool while on a trip in Dar es Salaam.

== Early life and education ==
Mac Elis was born on 1 December 1987. He lost his parents at the age of 6. Through Watoto Church's ministry to orphaned and vulnerable children, he was supported with his education. After completing high school, Elvis went into studio in the hopes that his dream to make music will become a reality.

== Music ==
Mac Elvis was raised by a church ministry. He had a passion for music and recorded and released his first album "Yo Love" in 2009. With the album, he embarked on a high school tour to promote it and spread the gospel to the youth. His second album, "Church boy" was recorded in 2011. He had attained depth in his lyrics and honed his production skills. The album put him on a higher level in the music industry. He was nominated twice for the Olive Gospel awards as the best new artiste and best RnB artiste. He has opened for big acts like Papa San, Kirk Franklin and Cece Winans during their shows in Kampala.

== Discography ==
=== Songs ===
- Topowa game
- Church boy
- Mufiirako

=== Albums ===
- Yo love, 2009
- Church boy, 2016
