= Saba Saba =

Ugandan musician (born 1977)

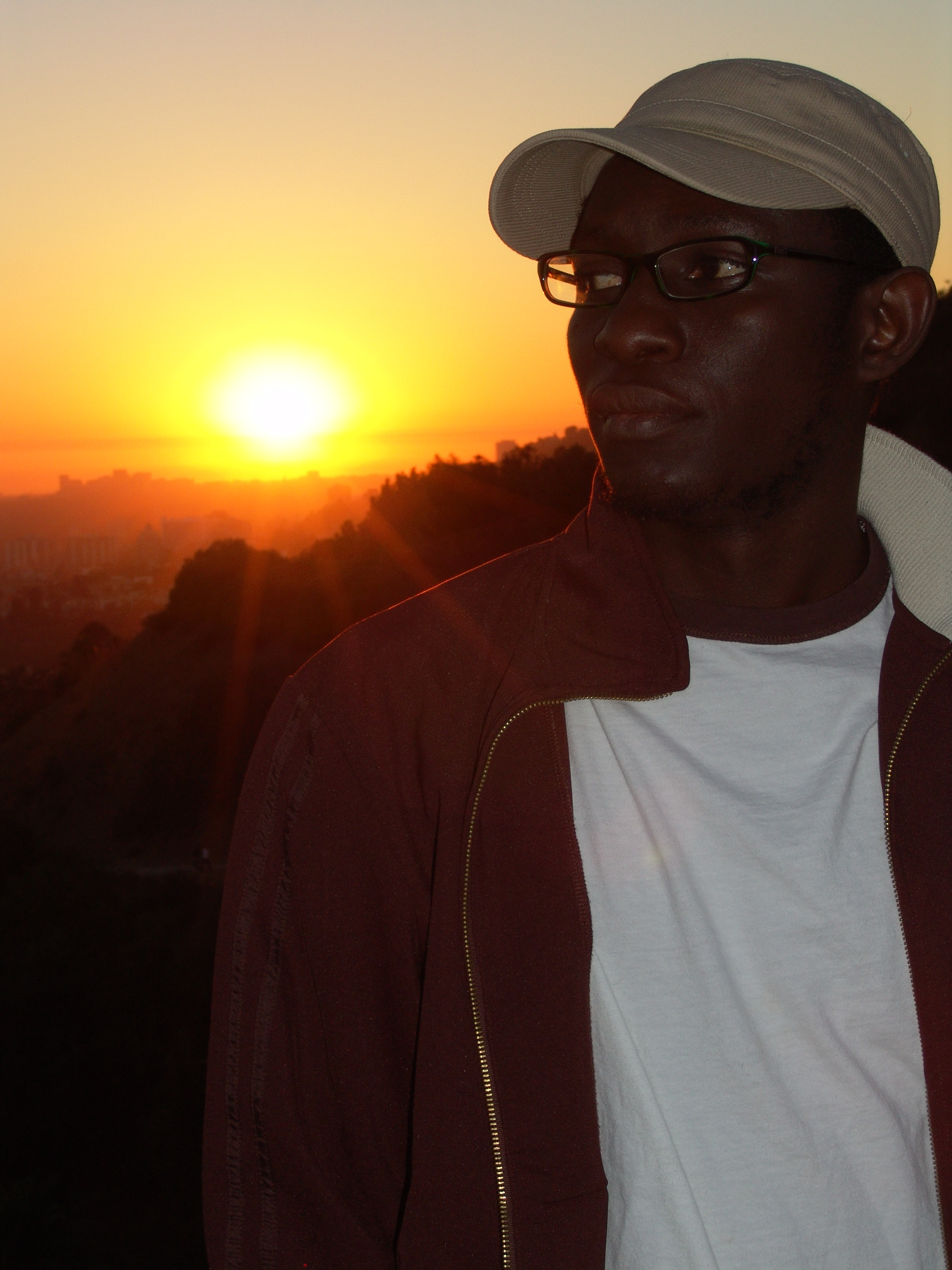
- Saba Saba in 2006

Background information
- Born: Alex Kirya; 5 August 1977 (age 48); Jinja, Uganda
- Origin: Kampala, Uganda
- Genres: Hip hop/African hip hop
- Occupations: Rapper; activist; singer
- Years active: 1993–present
- Label: Independent/Tujjababya Productions
- Website: www.sabasabamusic.com

Saba Saba, also known as Krazy Native (born Alex Kirya, 5 August 1977) is a rapper and social activist from Uganda.

Saba Saba began his hip hop career in 1993 with the group Bataka Squad. Saba Saba is now a solo artist, but remains a member of Bataka Squad. Saba Saba appeared in the film Diamonds in the Rough. He currently lives in Kampala, Uganda and Los Angeles and continues to write, produce and perform.

Saba Saba released his solo album Tujjababya the Hard Way in 2006 He released Bataka Revolution in 2008 with Bataka Squad, and is featured on the 2010 Afrolution Vol. 2: The Original African Hip Hop Collection.

== Biography ==
Saba Saba was born in Jinja, Uganda, during the dictatorship of Idi Amin During his childhood, his family moved many times to avoid political turmoil and fighting.

Saba Saba attended Kabojja primary school and later Kasasa Secondary school. It was in secondary school that he met Lyrical G, a member of the crew Bataka Underground – later the Bataka Squad. In 1992, Saba made his first hip hop performance a few months after he saw the movie Wild Style, a hip hop breakdance video.

== Bataka Underground / Bataka Squad period ==
In 1994, Saba Saba joined Bataka Underground. It consisted of Babaluku, Momo MC, and Lyrical G. They were later joined by Newton, Chagga, Shillingz, Furious B from Burundi, Larat, Lyn, and Slob MC the youngest of the crew.

In 1994, Bataka crew had their first major performance in Mwanza in Tanzania The group recorded its first single ATOOBA, written by Babaluku and produced by Mukalazi. The single did not receive any airplay in Uganda until three years later.. ATOOBA became a favourite on the underground hip hop scene and is still regarded as a Ugandan hip hop classic. It was one of the first major hip hop songs sung in Luganda or Lugaflow, the native Ugandan language.

In 1997, Bataka Underground recorded their second hit, Ssesetula They were able to perform at numerous clubs in Kampala, including Club Pulsations to Lido Beach, Club Silk, Botanical Gardens, Little Flowers, Bingo Cinema, and Sharing youth Center.

In 1998, Saba Saba won the 'Mr. Club Silk' Contest for his social-political ballistic rhymes of the day.

In 1999, Bataka crew released Bana Beka. The same year, Saba changed his style of rhyme from the braggadocio lyricist to the social political conscious rapper. They then began working on their major project, The Foundation. It was released in 2000 including the songs 'Ndimubi' (Am bad), 'Lets ride', 'The Foundation', 'Eno Ensi' (This world), the hit singles 'Ssesetula' and 'Atooba'.

In 2001, Saba Saba, Chizo, DJ Benarda, alongside some of the Bataka crew, went for a tour in Kigali, Rwanda and Bujumbura, Burundi. Bujumbura gave Bataka so much love and are still revered up to today. The same year, they performed with Bujumbura group 'Niga Soul' in Havana and Casanova, Burundi.

After their East Africa tour, the Bataka crew performed two concerts with British rap/poetry crew 'Shrine'.

== Solo career ==
From 2002 to 2003, Saba Saba pursued a solo music career. He said, "I'm really happy that I was there when this hip hop movement in Uganda began and I participated in all these memorable moments."

In 2003, Saba and Xenson, later joined by Jeff Ekongot, Francis Agaba, and the late Paul Mwandha, formed the Uganda Hip Hop Foundation with the mission of promoting Ugandan hip hop in Uganda and worldwide. The foundation sponsored the first Ugandan Hip Hop Summit and Concert in 2003, featuring Klear Kut, Bataka Squad, Lyrical G, Maurice Kirya, Vamposs and Benon, Emma Katya and Extra Mile.

In 2004, Saba performed as a delegate of the Uganda Hiphop Foundation at the 'Rock against Aids' concert in Nairobi, Kenya.

In 2005, Saba Saba changed his stage name from Krazy Native to Saba Saba to reflect his growth as an artist and his increased political and social consciousness of his homeland Uganda and Africa as a whole. That same year, Saba Saba and Frances Agaba represented Uganda at the UN's Global Hip Hop Summit in South Africa. Saba Saba performed at the Summit.

In 2005 Saba Saba released a single and video "Tujababya". He was nominated for both best hip hop artist and best hip hop single in the 2005 Pearl of Africa Music Awards. In 2006, he released the album 'Tujjababya the hardway' which highlights the tribulations of a Ugandan hip hop artist. Songs from this album include Wansi Wagalu, which addresses police brutality. An accompanying video documented the riots in Kampala during the 2005 presidential campaign.

In April 2006, Saba Saba performed at the International Trinity College Annual International Hip Hop Festival, Hartford, Connecticut. Saba Saba also performed in New York City at the Prospect Park African Festival, at the 9:30 Club in Washington, DC, and at Syracuse University's Amnesty International Benefit Concert for Sudan. In 2006 and 2007 he performed with Michael Franti at the Power to the Peaceful festival in San Francisco.

In 2006, Saba Saba was featured in the documentary Diamonds in the Rough: A Ugandan Hip Hop Revolution. The documentary was produced by 3rdi a.k.a. Brett Mazurek, about the efforts of Bataka Squad members Saba Saba and Babaluku using music to inspire and bring hope to the young children of Uganda. He also appeared as a panellist and performer for Harvard University's Conference "African Youth Development through Art and Technology – The Role of African Hip Hop" in 2008.

Saba was working on the solo album, Cup of Coffee with... It was to feature the single "Obwavu Koondo" ("Poverty and Fate") which tells the true story of Ugandan women beaten to death by her husband because of her concern over her children's fate after he sold their home. Saba Saba has recently released the single and video Harambe. It has been used in documentary by Vice Media called Wakaliwood. Harambe went on to be used in the 2016 movie Queen of Katwe as a soundtrack.

== Discography ==
=== Albums ===
- 2006: Tujjababya the Hard Way
- 2008: Bataka Revolution
- 2010/2011: Bulaaya
- 2010/2011: Cup of Coffee within

=== Singles ===
- 2003: "Tujjababya"
- 2003: "Wansi Wagulu"
- 2008: "Obwavu Kondo"
- 2008: "Connect"
- 2009: "World Mash"
- 2009: "Uganda" w/DJ Spooky
- 2010: "Harambe"

== Filmography ==
- Diamonds in the Rough
- Wild sound
