= Not for Sale (mixtape) =

Mixtape by Flex D'Paper
- Released: June 27, 2017
- Recorded: 2015–17
- Genre: Hip hop; trap; R&B
- Label: Rapaholix Music
- Producer: Aethan Music, Baru Beats, Sam Lamara, Mio Made, The Weezy

Singles from Not For Sale
- 1. "Day Ones" Released: 3 June 2016; 2. "Yenze Aliko" Released: 27 June 2017

Not for Sale is the first solo mixtape by Ugandan recording artist and record producer Flex D'Paper. A follow-up to Eviction Notice mixtape by Rapaholix in 2012 that had songs from Flex and fellow members. Not For Sale was released on 27 June 2017 by his imprint Rapaholix Music on the TheTribe Ug website, a popular hip hop platform online in Uganda.

== Background and promotion ==
Flex D'Paper describes the project in three ways. In an interview with TheTribeUg, he talked about naming the mixtape Not For Sale because the project was going to be free online for his fans. He emphasised how he had delayed to release a project and so this was a free one, to make up for that time the fans didn't get an album or mixtape from him. Days before releasing the mixtape, Flex D'Paper revealed it was also titled Not For Sale, as a dedication to victims of human trafficking as well as a dedication to victims of land wrangles, a common struggle in Uganda. The mixtape was supported by the single "Yenze Aliko", a Luganda slang that means "I Am what's on", a song produced by Mio Made, and mixed by Sam Lamara.

== Track listing ==
No.	Title	Writer(s)	Producer(s)	Length
1.	"Not For Sale intro" (featuring a pass)	A pass	Game Over	0.55
2.	"I feel like" (featuring Young Lean, Big Tril)	Kwesigabo Alex, Big Tril Kaiza, Young Lean	The Weezy	3:43
3.	"Ting Badi Malo"	Khaligragh Jones, Kwesigabo Alex	Blue Ink	3:26
4.	"Flex D'Hustler (Interlude)" (Navio)	Kigozi Daniel	Navcorp	0:33
5.	"Day Ones" (featuring Navio, Martha Smallz)	Kwesigabo Alex, Kigozi Daniel	Aethan Music	4:05
6.	"Never Give Up"	Mako Loco, Kwesigabo Alex	Wayne Anira	3:58
7.	"6am In Nairobi"	Kwesigabo Alex	Baru Beats	3:12
8.	"Man Dem (Interlude)" (featuring Kemishan)	Kemishan	Andy Music	0:18
9.	"Day Ones Germany Remix"	Kwesigabo Alex, Mako Loco, P Bane	Aethan Music	4:06
10.	"Yenze Aliko"	Kwesigabo Alex	Mio Made	3:40
11.	"The Statement"	Kwesigabo Alex	Tribal	3:00
12.	"Victory Song" (featuring Ruyonga, Levixone, Andy Music and Ninja C)	Kwesigabo Alex, Levixone, Andy Music, Sonny Soweez, Brian Giddy, Ruyonga, Cynthia Tumwine	The Weezy	4:22

== Release history ==
List of release dates, showing region, formats, label, editions and reference
Region	Date	Format(s)	Label	Edition(s)
Worldwide	June 27, 2017	digital download	Rapaholix Music	Standard edition
Worldwide	October 14, 2017	CD	Rapaholix Music	Standard edition

== Awards ==
Mixtape of the Year - UG Hip Hop Awards 2017
