= BigTril =

Ugandan rapper

- Born: Rowland Raymond Kaiza; 1990 (age 35–36); Uganda
- Genres: Hip hop
- Occupations: Rapper; record producer; composer; songwriter; radio presenter; pianist
- Years active: 2011-present
- Labels: Baboon Forest Entertainment; Striker Entertainment

Rowland Raymond Kaiza (born 1990), better known by his stage name BigTril is a Ugandan rapper, producer and songwriter. He is known for his single "Parte After Parte".

== Early life ==
Rowland was born in 1990 in Uganda. He was raised as the fourth child out of five by single mother, Esther Nankinga. He attended Turkish Light Academy for his O and A-levels before graduating and gaining admission to Makerere University for a bachelor's degree in Journalism and Mass Communication. He was a very smart student with good grades. He dropped out after one year to pursue a musical career.

== Career ==
=== 2010-2018: Career beginnings, minor hits with Baboon Forest Entertainment, signing to new label, Striker Entertainment ===
Rowland has stated his stage name, BigTril, to be an acronym for "Born in Greatness To Rise into a Legend". He did a lot of rhymes and poetry in high school but claimed that he never planned to venture into music but it rather 'called out' to him.

"It just called out to me. I had good grades but after I was done with school, I just told my mum I wanted to do music. She wasn't surprised because she told me when she met my dad he was a DJ. She said she would support me and she has been very supportive ever since. I started in 2011 and the journey has been dope; but like any other journey, you have your ups and downs. It hasn't been easy but then in life nothing is easy." - BigTril

Rowland started out by battle rapping also known as underground rap while still in Makerere University at Club Rouge and Nana hostel. It was during one of these rapping sessions that he hooked up with GNL Zamba (GNL popularized Lugaflow before relocating to the United States) who signed him to Baboon Forest Entertainment. He worked with BFE for three years before working as a radio host on X Fm (a radio station in Uganda). During this time, he released minor hit singles that failed to gain popularity outside Uganda such as "Push Harder" in 2012, "Pretty Girls" in 2015, "Bad Gyal Ting" in 2017 and "Giddem".

Rowland left Baboon Forest Entertainment when he met John Obas Isokpehi, CEO of Striker Entertainment, a Nigerian label based in Uganda who got him signed.

=== 2019-Present: "Parte After Parte" and planned upcoming debut concert ===
Rowland released his single "Parte After Parte" in August 2019 with the official music video on 13 September 2019. It currently has 2.1million views on YouTube. The song received a lot of airplay in places outside Uganda including Nigeria, South Africa and Kenya where it became gained popularity after Rowland performed it during the Nyege Nyege festival, eventually becoming an unofficial anthem. It peaked at number one on the African Music Chart. It peaked at number one on the Apple Music Top 100 charts in Uganda, Kenya, Zambia and Malawi and number two on the Apple Music Top 100: Nigeria chart behind Davido and Popcaan's "Risky". It also peaked at number one on BBC Radio 1Xtra's DJ Edo DNA's Top 5 countdown. It also peaked in the top 10 positions on the Boomplay Music Top 100: Nigeria chart. BigTril planned to embark on his debut concert in early 2020 sometime in the month of March.

=== Possible Future Collaborations ===
During a five-day trip in Uganda, Nigerian-American singer and rapper, Jidenna revealed plans of a possible collaboration with BigTril, Eddy Kenzo and Fik Fameica.

Sailors, a Kenyan group known for their "Wamlambez" single and BigTril performed at the Valentine's Jamboree Concert in Nairobi where they talked about the possibility of a collaboration. At Ole Sereni Hotel, Miracle Baby, lead singer of Sailors said, "Artistes talk to each other and when they meet, they attract each other, so a collab is coming." BigTril who has a growing interest in Kenya's music scene with songs like "Wamlambez" and "Figa" also voiced the possibility of a collaboration.

In a tweet, DJ Tunez (Wizkid's main producer and DJ) hinted at a collaboration between the two artistes.

== Parte After Parte (single) ==
"Parte After Parte"

Single by BigTril
- Released: August 2019
- Genre: hip-hop/rap
- Length: 2:47
- Label: Striker Entertainment
- Songwriter: Rowland Raymond Kaiza
- Producer: Rowland Raymond Kaiza

=== Background and inspiration ===
BigTril has discussed the inspiration behind the song saying it came when he was in the studio and decided to take a break when he got no vibe. He watched a video on Instagram. The clip was taken from a TV interview with Ugandan American pastor, Martin Ssempa on NBS Television in December 2012. Martin Ssempa made controversial comments while talking about the LGBTQ community. In a heated argument with an LGBTQ rights activist, Ssempe complained about how the youth only care about the glamorous life of partying day after day, "party, after party".

BigTril replaced the 'y' in 'party' with 'e' so it became 'parte' which he repeated over and over until it became a catchy hook. He produced the beat and wrote the song on the same day.

=== Composition ===
"Parte After Parte" is a hip-hop/rap song that runs for two minutes and forty-seven seconds with a fast beat which sounds like an early 2000s hip-hop song from any Anglophone African country with arrangements of a suo or konto sound infused in it.

=== Promotion and popularity ===
BigTril performed the song during the four-day Nyege Nyege festival held in Jinja, Kenya two weeks after its release. It became an unofficial Nyege Nyege festival anthem.

The song grew more popular when it was used in memes that circulated round the internet catching the attention of Nigerian, South African and Kenyan citizens as well as other nations.

Nigerian artistes such as Wizkid, Davido, Zlatan Ibile, and Olamide expressed their love for the song with Wizkid endorsing it and Davido calling it a 'nice song'. Olamide was seen singing to it in a video he posted on social media. Mayorkun, another Nigerian artist also posted a video of him singing the song on his Instagram story.

Its popularity was not limited to only African nations. American Grammy Award winning rapper, Cardi B posted a video of her and husband, Offset singing and dancing to the song while leaving a bar on the latter's birthday.

"Parte After Parte" was one of ten African songs listed in The Guardian's 2019 in African pop: 10 must-listen tracks published on Christmas Eve 2019.

=== Music video ===
An official music video directed by Kino Filmz was released on 13 September 2019. It hit a million views after three months. As of September 2020, the video has 1.9 million views. It's still growing up as it currently have 2.1 million views as of October 2022.

=== Commercial performance ===
"Parte After Parte" peaked at number one on the Apple Music Top 100 charts in Uganda, Kenya, Zambia and Malawi. It charted at the 11th, 8th and 6th places before peaking at number two on the Apple Music Top 100: Nigeria chart behind Davido and Popcaan's "Risky". It also peaked at number one on BBC Radio 1Xtra's DJ Edu DNA's Top 5 countdown.

=== Possible remix ===
BigTril said that some Nigerian and South African artistes have approached him to record a remix but he knows some Kenyan artistes who can make the cut.

== Artistry ==
=== Influences ===
Rowland draws inspiration from Jay-Z, Notorious B.I.G. and Kanye West. Rowland is a big fan of Kenyan artistes such as Madtraxx, Sauti Sol and Khaligraph Jones. He admires rapper, Keko and Klear Kut legend, Navio (rapper).

=== Genre ===
As a rapper, Rowland's songs are mainly hip-hop. However, when asked about his genre, he said,

"I don't belong to any genre, that's putting labels on art. I believe art is formless and the best way to express yourself. I've always been a rapper but now I produce my own music. I produced "Parte After Parte" myself. Since I started production, I don't want to box myself into any genre. I'm a vibes creator. As long as it's a vibe and I can imagine it, then I create it."

=== Style ===
BigTril raps in a mixture of English and Luganda.

== Personal life ==
Rowland is currently single but said he could wed a Kenyan woman if she was suitable. He has called Ugandan female model, Lydia Jazmine the "hottest model".

Rowland has been open on how depression almost ruined his career before meeting John Obas Isokpehi, the CEO of Striker Entertainment.

=== Comments on Ugandan 2021 Presidential Candidate, Robert Kyagulanyi Ssentamu ===
When Kyadondo East lawmaker, Robert Kyagulanyi Ssentamu also known by his stage name Bobi Wine, announced his bid to run for president in the Ugandan 2021 general election, BigTril noted that he will be disappointed if his manifesto doesn't include enforcing the copyright law in Uganda to protect content creators for the years he has been in the culture and creative industry. This was days after he complained of Uganda's music industry being broke.

"If Bobi Wine doesn't talk about enforcing the copyright law in Uganda to protect content creators in his manifesto then I'll be really disappointed" - BigTril

== Awards and nominations ==
BigTril has won two Buzz Teeniez Awards for Hottest Hip-Hop Song of the Year and Hottest Song of the Year for "Parte After Parte" in 2019. BigTril won a Zzina award in 2020 in the Best Lugaflow/Rap Song category for "Parte After Parte".

== Discography ==
Singles

- Wangi
- Batuwulira (featuring Fille Mutoni)
- Giddem (featuring Beenie Gunter)
- Awo
- No Yawa
- Sibalaba
- Rollin Dank
- She Got Me Blind (2011)
- Push Harder (2012)
- Your Ways (2014)
- Pretty Girls (2015)
- Bad Gyal Ting' (2017)
- Faya (2017)
- Why They Hate (2018)
- We Good (2018)
- Parte After Parte (2019)
- Feel like ft FlexD' Paper
- Og ft Vector, Larry gaaga, raezy.
- Mamacita.
