= Keko (Guyanese rapper) =

- Born: Rayon Payne; 7 November 1974 (age 52); Georgetown, Guyana
- Genre: Hip hop
- Occupation: Radio Host/Musician
- Years active: 1998–present

Keko was born Rayon Payne, in Guyana and he's known by many names: NSX, The Gorilla, Junior Payne. He's a radio host who founded the pirate radio station 95Live 95.9 in Orlando, Florida. Keko hosted a talk show called Afternoon Crash, the station had a strong grassroots following until the FCC indicted him for operating a radio station without a license. He was subsequently sentenced to prison 9 months for a federal misdemeanor.

After completing his prison sentence, he founded Myspace Radio. He hoped to get back into radio, but that was short-lived when Myspace, Inc. filed a complaint with National Arbitration Forum over the name, and the National Arbitration Forum ruled against him.

He tried his skills at talent management and he began representing the NY Giants player, Jay Bromley which had a rocky start with scandal when Bomley was accused of rape. Keko returned to radio and in 2018 he started the Folksalert Podcast.

== Radio career ==
1. 95Live: 1998 – 2002
2. Myspace Radio: 2004 – 2007
3. Gotfolks: 2005–Present
4. Folksalert: 2007–Present

In 2019 Keko released the Gorilla Pimping album, a combination his podcast and music from recording artists such as Compton Menace, 2eleven, Freddie Gibbs, and Mouth Piece. The song Folksalert was inspired because the Folksalert brand is a well known song with pimps.

== Discography ==
=== Albums ===
- 2019 Gorilla Pimping

== Singles ==
- Folksalert
