= Gabie Ntaate =

Ugandan gospel artist (born 1992)

- Also known as: Gabie Ntaate
- Born: Gabriella Bridget Ntaate; 14 April 1992 (age 34); Namirembe Hospital, Kampala, Uganda
- Genre: Afrobeat
- Years active: 2018–present
- Label: Ntaate Music

Gabriella Bridget Ntaate (born on April 14, 1992), commonly known as Gabie Ntaate is a Ugandan gospel singer. She won Sauti Awards after beating six renowned continental gospel competitors for the crown. She also won the Zouk Song of the Year 2021 in the Royal Gospel Music Awards.

== Early life and education ==
Gabriella Bridget Ntaate, a Munyoro by birth, was born on April 14, 1992, She completed her Primary Leaving Examinations (PLE) at Shimoni, pursued her ordinary level of education at St. Lawrence, and furthered her advanced level of education at St. Noah Zana.

== Career ==
Gabie Ntaate was an actress with her first role as Fatima, a nurse, in the television series Second Chance in 2014. Ntaate started her music career as a cover artist in 2016 under a band called Mute band and other live bands for a duration of approximately two years prior to the release of her debut single, titled "Wano", in the year 2018. She is identified as a follower of the Seventh-day Adventist religious denomination. Gabie Ntaate joined Spark TV in September 2018, where she was paired with her co-host following the departure of the popular duo Zahara Totto and Anna Talia Oze from the show, a job she quit in 2021 to focus on her music career.

== Discography ==
Some of her songs are:

- Brag About God
- Amuleese
- Oyitangayo
- Nkwagala Promise
- Gw'asembayo
- Me because of You
- Ruhanga Ankantorana
- Cheza For Yesu
- Taata Wange
- Binene
- Conqueror
- Weapon of Victory
- Awo
- Nange Nkwetaga
- Ninze
- Nsubira
- Wano

== Awards and nominations ==
- Sauti Awards
- Royal Gospel Music Awards Zouk Song of the Year, at Brag About God.

Awards and nominations of Gabie Ntaate
Year	Awards	Category	Result
2022	Royal gospel music awards	Female artist of the year; Zouk song of the year (Brag about God); Song of the year (Brag about God)	Won
2023	Vine gospel awards	Female artist of the year	Won
2023	Sauti Awards	African female artist of the year	Won
2024	Royal gospel music awards	Song of the year (Binene); Female artist of the year; Artist of the year	Nominated
