= Pia Pounds =

Ugandan musician

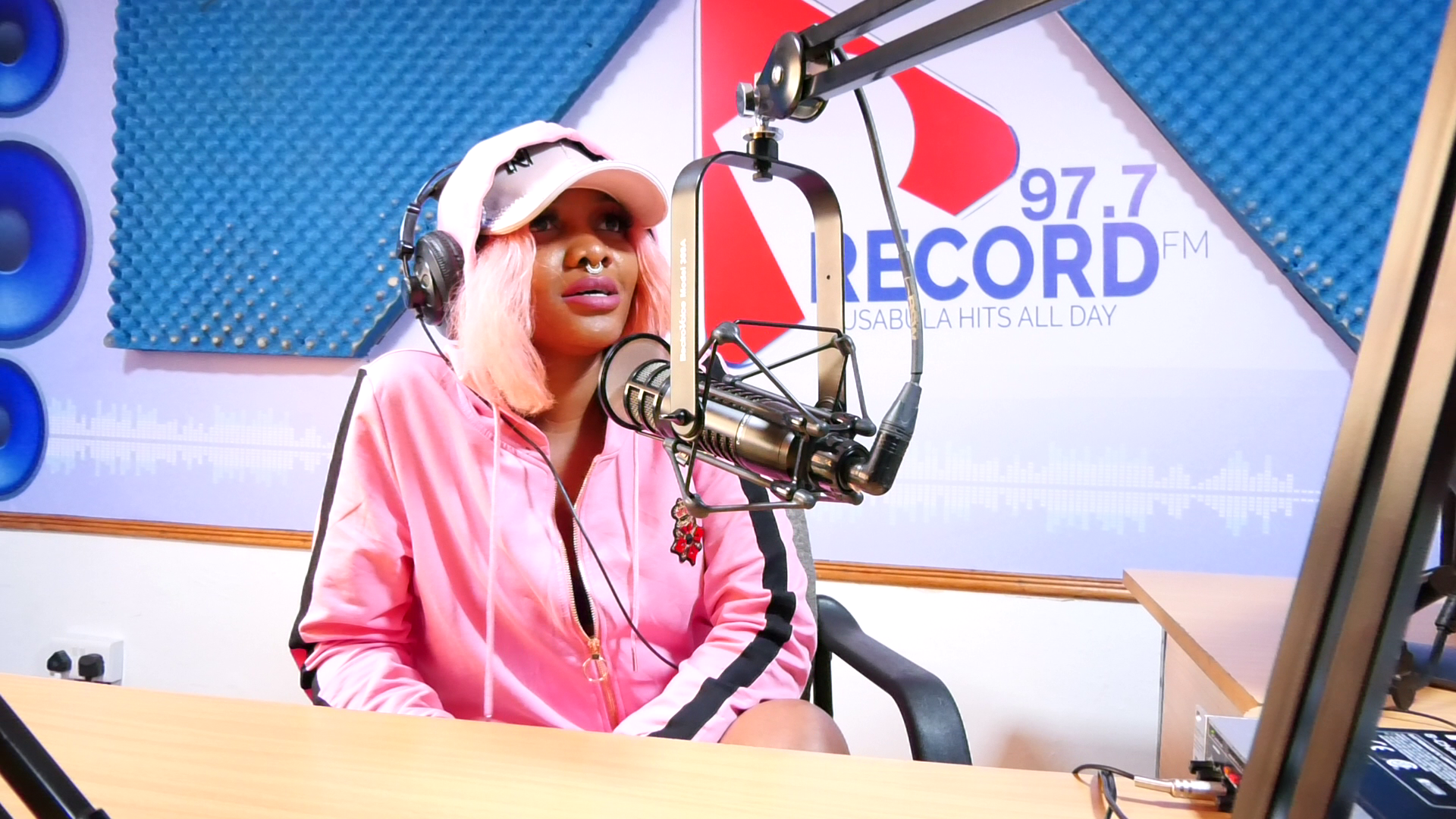
- Pia Pounds during a radio interview at Record Fm in Kampala in 2019.
- Born: Tracy Kirabo; 8 November 1996 (age 29); Uganda
- Education: International University of East Africa
- Occupation: Musician
- Musical career
- Genres: Electronic dance music; Afrobeat
- Years active: 2011 – present
- Label: African Bureau of Music – ABM (current)

Pia Pounds whose birth name is Tracy Kirabo, is a Ugandan singer-songwriter known for electronic dance, RnB, and Afrobeat music. She is also an actor and businesswoman.

She gained significant international recognition with her hit single Tupaate, which became a viral sensation and achieved a remarkable milestone by being featured in the Netflix series Young, Famous & African, making her the first Ugandan female artist to attain such an honor.

== Background and early life ==
Born on 8 November 1996 in Gomba and raised in Buziga by her auntie after the death of her mother when she was 2 years old.

== Career ==
Pounds grew up doing odd jobs to sustain herself, raise money for school fees and also get money for her music career. She demonstrated her musical talents from a young age through music and dance. She has performed live in Uganda, UAE, Kenya, Rwanda and South Sudan.

In 2011, Pounds was first recognized on the music scene at 14 years while in high school with her song titled "Just the Way You Are" which featured Ragga Dee. She took a hiatus in music and returned to finish high school.

She returned into music while she was a sophomore student at university in 2017. She was signed by Eddy Kenzo’s Big Talent Entertainment label in 2018. Under Big Talent, Pounds' biggest releases were Tubawe and Wawangula. She refused to renew her contract with the label and exited Big Talent Entertainment and started releasing her music as an independent artist in 2019. She later teamed up with producer Kuseim and founded Pia Pounds Limited and co-founded the African Bureau of Music(ABM), where she released a string of singles like Tupaate and Bitimba.

Her EP titled Tupaate topped Uganda's hit list chart for example "Apple Music Top 100 Uganda 2023", her song "Tupaate" is part of the soundtrack for the Netflix show Young, Famous and African. "Tupaate RMX" (featuring Eddy Kenzo and McAfrika) was Trace Muzik "Song of the Year".

== Business venture ==
Pia Pounds has expanded her career beyond music into entrepreneurship. She is the owner of Fancy Fancier, a fashion store located at Shop F17 Ivory Mall, in Bunga, Uganda. The store has gained a reputation for offering trendy and stylish clothing, reflecting Pia's own passion for fashion and design. In addition, she co-founded the African Bureau of Music, a platform aimed at promoting African music and talent.

== Discography ==
=== Singles ===
- "Each Other"
- "Ndi Single"
- "Ingino"
- "Love You More"
- "Big Budget"
- "Style feat. John Blaq"
- "Tupaate"
- "Bitimba"
- "Taala"
- "Tupaate" (Jazz edition)
- "Wawangula"
- "Wankikuba"
- "Tupaate" (feat. Eddy Kenzo and McAfrika)
- "Wanting Me"
- "Selection"
- "Kasonda"
- "Slay Farmer"
- "Byompa" (feat. Fik Fameica)
- "Wuuba"
- "Big Love"
- "Yo Body"
- "Delicious"
- "Sili Muyaaye"
- "Easy"

== Achievements and awards ==
- 2021: Janzi Awards – Tupaate – Outstanding Song of the Year.
- 2021: Janzi Awards – Outstanding Video of the Year
- 2022/2023: ASFA (Abryanz) – Most Stylish Female Artist

== Advocating for Uganda Premier League (UPL) and Ugandan Football ==
Pounds has taken a unique step in her public engagements by expressing strong support for Ugandan football. She has used her social media platforms and public appearances to rally fans ahead of the upcoming AFCON 2025 qualifier match against South Africa on 15 November 2024.

In her tweet on 7 April 2024, stressing accessibility and airplay of Uganda's biggest soccer Uganda Premier League. FUFA president Moses Magogo Hassim pledged support for her for supporting and posting about Uganda Premier League.

== See also ==
- Naira Ali
- Halima Namakula
- Veronica Lugya
