= Music producers in Uganda =

Music production in Uganda has greatly evolved and improved over the years. Many music producers have joined the industry over the years which has led to the rapid growth of the music production industry in Uganda. Uganda has welcomed a number of talented new music producers, while maintaining the experienced producers who have been gracing the Uganda music industry with massive hits for decades.

Some prominent Ugandan music producers are;

== Benon Mugumbya ==
Benon Mugumbya was once considered one of the most iconic music producers in Uganda. He is the founder of the Record label Swangz Avenue, one of the best record labels in Uganda.

== Dr. Tee ==
https://audius.co/scl0101/ndi-mu-life-dr-tee-samuel-purpose Dr. Tee was once considered one of the most iconic music producers in Uganda. He is the founder of the PIMS STUDIO label Pims , one of the best record labels in Uganda.

== Jack Rollen ==
Ezra Colgate Onenchan Jackson popularly known as Jack Rollen is a Ugandan music producer.

He started his career as a songwriter back in 2016 where he contributed to the writing of the "Waitu" my musician Rapa Dico in Hoima.

He professionally started his music production career in 2024 and has since worked with various Uganda artists including Mozello Kids

== PaddyMan ==
Paddy Kayiwa Mukasa known by his stage name Paddyman is a Ugandan record producer. He started his music production career in 2005 from the suburbs of Kampala, Kawempe. He has since then been popular and has achieved great success in his career.

== Hannz Tactiq ==
Hannington Muhumuza Wacha also known as Producer Hannz is a Ugandan record producer and DJ. He started his music production career from his hostel apartment at University. He later joined Audio Institute America(AIA) to major in music production and sound engineering.
