= Zafaran (musician) =

Ugandan musician, songwriter, actress and singer

Josephine Nakyoonyi, known professionally as Zafaran is a Ugandan singer and songwriter. She is signed to Swangz Avenue. She is an R&B, Afrobeat, dancehall, and raga singer.

== Background and education ==
Zafaran was born in Busega to Catherine Kalinda and the late Hajji Isaac Kayiira Makumbi.She is the youngest of her mother's seven children. She grew up in Namasuba, along Entebbe road, after her father passed away.

Zafaran attended her primary education at Lufuka Islamic school and Our Lady of Mount Carmel. She completed her for Olevel education at Lubiri secondary school, and St. Peter's secondary school Nsambya for A-levels. She later enrolled at Makerere University Business School (MUBS) for a degree in Transport and Logistics but dropped out due to financial challenges.

== Career ==
=== Musical career ===
Zafaran’s musical talent emerged in her early years through her involvement in church activities, where she sang in the choir, a passion encouraged by her mother, a devout Catholic. She was awarded a scholarship by a reverend father due to her singing skills.

Despite her mother's reservations about her involvement in music, she continued to pursue her passion by joining various Ugandan live music bands such as UB 5, Gin Afric, Nilers, Bahati Music, and A Ka Dope band.

Zafaran worked as a backup vocalist for other Ugandan artists including Jose Chameleone, King Saha, John Blaq, Karole Kasita, B2C, and Maureen Nantume. Her powerful voice and ability to harmonize with different artists helped her gain recognition in Uganda's music scene.

In December 2023, Zafaran’s talent was discovered by a bandmate at A Ka Dope, who introduced her to Swangz Avenue. After sending a demo to Benon Mugumbya, Zafaran was called for a meeting in January 2024. Although no contract was signed immediately, she was officially introduced as a Swangz Avenue artist in March 2024, alongside fellow signees Winnie Nwagi, Vinka, and Azawi. In March 2024, Zafaran was unveiled as the newest signing to Swangz Avenue. She released her debut single, "Sweetheart," in April 2024.

== Read also ==
- Vinka
- Swangz Avenue
- Azawi
