= Viboyo =

Musical artist and music producer

Viboyo Oweyo

Background information
- Also known as: Boyo, Oweyo, Viboyo
- Born: Moses Nsubuga aka Viboyo; February 14, 1984 (age 42)
- Origin: Kampala, Uganda
- Genres: Afrobeat, Reggae, Ragga, Kidandali
- Occupations: Singer-songwriter, Rapper, Singer, Writer, Composer, Film Producer, Film Fixer entrepreneur
- Instrument: Vocals
- Years active: 2002–present
- Label: Swangz Avenue

Viboyo Oweyo, real name Nsubuga Moses, is a Ugandan musician and record producer. He is signed to Swangz Avenue. He's credited for his rap ups every year ( a compilation of events that happened throughout the year.) He has collaborated with music heavy weights like Radio and Weasel "Nyumbani", Cindy Sanyu, "nyumirwa", Irene Ntale, In "Banyilila", "St Nelly Sade in rap up 2018", and Gnl Zamba vocals appeared on his rap up 2019.

== Music ==
Viboyo Oweyo was born in 1984 to Nsubuga Moses. He started his music career in 1997 with hip-hop. In 2002 he changed to Afro-beat and released songs like "Owino Muwulire". He released his first album, Boyo's Dream, in 2005.

He put his music career on hold to promote and write songs for other musicians. He was an artist manager and producer. He returned to music in 2010 with songs like "Gyembadde", "Muzik"and "Nyumbani" ft. Radio and Weasel. His second album, Kiwundo Afilliationz (The Masterpiece) was released in 2014. His third album, Desire, is scheduled for release in 2015.

Viboyo Oweyo's music is distributed by Kelele Digital, an international company that distributes music through different channels. His music is also available on YouTube, SoundCloud, and iTunes.

== Discography ==
=== Songs ===
- RapUp 2018
- RapUp 2017
- RapUp 2016
- Music Africa
- Ajooga
- Keep Striving
- Muwulire
- Love Me Love Me
- Desire
- Appetizer
- Mbikwata Mpola
- Amulimba
- Bisima
- Nyoso Na Motema
- Survival
- Sente
- Banyilila with Irene Ntale
- Gimme di Title
- Nyumbani with Goodlyfe Crew
- Zzina
- Mukka
- Pale Pote
- Tukola
- We Go
- Time
- Nyumirwa
- Kitoobero
- Parey
- Ndi Mu fix
- Sibawulila with Mun G
- The Beat

=== Albums ===
- Kiwundo Afilliationz (The Masterpiece), 2014
- Desire, 2015
- Hand Made Triumph Omupambanyi 2024

== Nominations and awards ==
Viboyo has been nominated various times for Ugandan music and entertainment awards. He won the following awards:

- HiPipo Music Awards, Best Afropop Song 2012
- Buzz Teenies, Best Collabo 2012
- HiPipo Music Awards, Best Afrobeat song 2013, "Love Me Love Me"
