= Azawi =

Ugandan musician (born 1996)

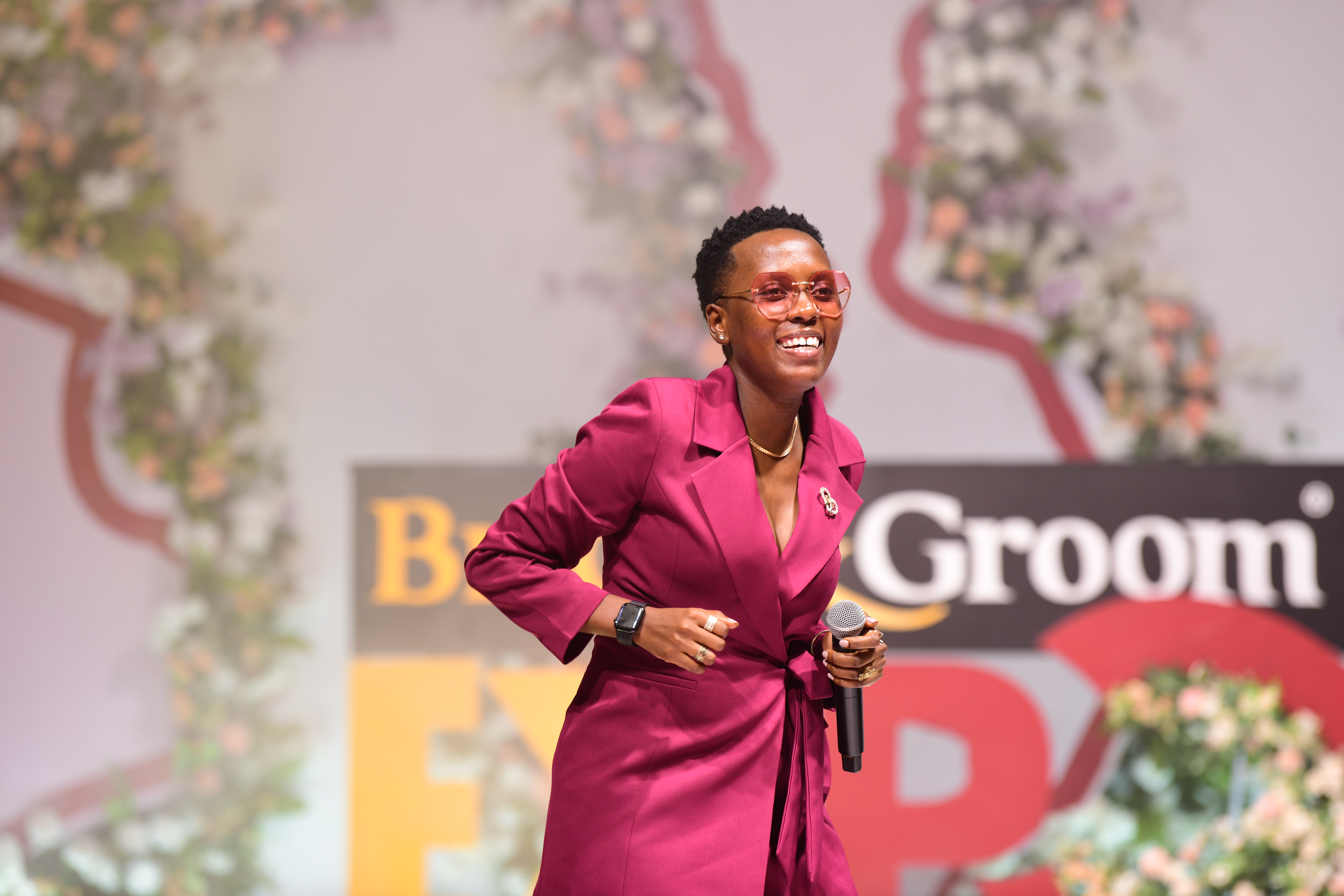
- Azawi at Swangz Avenue in 2023
- Born: Priscilla Zawedde; 2 February 1996 (age 30); Kampala, Uganda
- Education: Makerere University (Bachelor of Commerce)
- Occupations: Singer, songwriter
- Years active: 2020–present
- Known for: Musical artist
- Style: African music

Priscilla Zawedde (born 2 February 1996), better known as Azawi, is a Ugandan singer-songwriter and dancer. She was signed to Swangz Avenue (record label) in 2019. Her musical genre is Afrobeats in both Luganda and English.

She became the first female Ugandan act to appear on the New York City "Times Square" and Los Angeles billboards.

== Early life and education ==
Priscilla Zawedde was born 2 February 1996 in Kampala to the late Walusimbi Samuel and Nakamatte Mary. She went to Buganda Road Primary for her early education, and then to Mother Kevin Primary school in Mukono District, where she completed her primary seven. She went to St Henry's college in Ggangu Masajja, Lubiri Secondary School, London College in Nansana, and St Janani Luwum Secondary School for A-level. At Makerere University, she earned a Bachelor of Commerce degree.

== Career ==
=== Early career ===
Azawi's career began in 2005 as a dancer in the Kika dance troupe. They performed on many stages. Four years later, she joined the dance group Crane Performers, while still in school. After realizing that she was failing in school, she stopped dancing. She nevertheless traveled twice to China to perform with the troupe.

=== Music career ===
In 2011, she started writing songs, first as a hobby, before realizing she could make money from it. Her father died in 2012 and she had to help her mother and her two siblings, hence she concentrated on making money from songwriting.

Azawi's songwriting skills got her a meeting with Eddy Kenzo, who eventually connected her to other artistes. She has written for artistes including kenzo, Nina Rose, Lydia Jazmine, Carol Nantongo, and Vinka.

Azawi joined a band in 2015 while also working as a waiter at a restaurant her mother had started.

After she quit her job as a waiter, she wrote "Quinamino," with the intention of selling it, but when she walked into Swangz Avenue for the first time in August 2019, she got an offer to become part of the label instead.

Azawi's breakthrough came in January 2020 after releasing her first single, "Quinamino".

In November of the same year, Swangz Avenue management signed her. She released her first single under the label in January 2020. She is still under the same label, and now has over 20 songs.

== Discography ==
=== Albums ===
- Lo Fit (2020)
- African Music (2021)
- Sankofa

=== Singles ===
- Fwa Fwa Fwa
- Party mood
- Gimme
- Craving you heavy
- Bamututte
- Thankful ft Benon
- Majje ft Fik Fameica
- Slow dancing
- Face Me ft A Pass
- Fwa Fwa Fwa
- Ku Kido
- My Year
- Tubatiisa
- Party Mood
- Nkuchekele ft Eddy Kenzo
- Love you is easy
- African Music
- Ache for you
- Quinamino
- Repeat it
- Lo Fit
- Crazy lover
- Toast to 75
- Mbinyumirwa
- Envision
- Craving You Heavy Remix ft. Chike
- Masavu
- 10 over 10

== Awards and recognition ==
- Female Artist of the Year Janzi Awards 2021
- Outstanding Album of the Year – African Music Janzi Awards 2021
- Outstanding Afro Beat/Pop Artist Janzi Awards 2021
- Artist of the Year Buzz Teeniez Awards 2021
- Teenz Female Artist of the Year Buzz Teeniez Awards 2021
- Teenz Hottest Songwriter Buzz Teeniez Awards 2021
- Teenz Hottest Song of the Year – "Slow Dancing" Buzz Teeniez Awards 2021
- Teenz Flyest video – "Slow Dancing" Buzz Teeniez Awards 2021
- Female Artist of the year Zzina Awards 2021/22
- Best Song Writer of the year Zzina Awards 2021/22
- Best Inspirational Song – "Majje" ft Fik Fameica Zzina Awards 2021/22

== Other activities and achievements ==
Azawi is now a Guinness brand ambassador. This was also evidenced in her video for "Majje", which featured Ugandan artiste Fik Fameica and at her recent maiden sold-out concert at Lugogo, Kampala in July 2022.

Azawi in 2021 was featured on billboards in Los Angeles and New York City's Times Square, making her the first female and third Ugandan act to appear on the billboard after Eddy Kenzo and Bobi Wine.

== See also ==
- Naira Ali
- Iryn Namubiru
- Mariam Ndagire
- Angella Katatumba
