= Matovu =

Matovu is a surname. Notable people with the surname include:

- Jackson Matovu, Anglican bishop in Uganda
- Moses Matovu (born 1949), Ugandan musician and saxophonist
- Samalie Matovu, Ugandan singer
- Sula Matovu (born 1986), Ugandan soccer player
