= Kaleke kasome =

"Kaleke Kasome" is a song recorded at True Vine Studios in Makindye by music producer Didi March, officially released on 20 November 2005. Maurice Hasa composed and sang the song, about the pain, anger, and helplessness he felt due to the rape and murder of a four-year-old girl in his neighborhood.

Kaleke Kasome has proven to be instrumental in efforts to fight sex related crime; it has, for more than a decade, been a tool in awareness campaigns fighting against child molestation. The song was covered in May 2014 by a group of artists on request of RAHU (Reach A Hand Uganda). The recorded song was to be used in campaigns for sexual and reproductive health and rights. These artists included the original composer Maurice Hasa, GNL Zamba, a hip-hop artist based in Uganda, Ray Signature, a vocalist and songwriter, and Jody Phibi, a young female vocalist from Rwanda.

Kaleke Kasome was originally sung in Luganda, a language used by the Baganda people in central (also known as the Buganda Kingdom) and peripheral Uganda. The phrase kaleke kasome thus became a common phrase, one whose message everyone who understands Luganda can comprehend.

The lyrics of the song, which runs 5:38, directly plead for the rights of children to education. The song starts with a narrative of the hardships parents of low income go through to provide basic necessities to their children. It further describes the pain a mother in the slums undergoes seeing her daughter grow up to become a woman.

The song calls on young men in the ghettos to respect human rights with emphasis on the female. Songwriter Hasa directly requested everyone to let children continue with education free from sexual harassment, intimidation, and other forms of violence. He tells the world to stop seeing young girls as sexual partners because they need to complete their education. The last forty seconds are emotive, drawing a clear picture of rapists in the communities. They carry the most important lesson from the whole track, with sounds of a crying girl in the process of telling how a man had tricked her to get her in his house where he raped her.

Kaleke Kasome "let the child obtain education", was warmly welcomed by the whole country and beyond. The song is popular, and receives airtime on various FM stations, in homes, and with music vendors in countries such as Kenya and Tanzania, as well as Rwanda and Sudan, due to those who sought refuge in Uganda during war periods.

Many programs have gone on to use the song in different ways to achieve their objectives. The song has been performed at different events, including weddings.
