= Buka Chimey =

- Born: Musolo David; May 5, 1993 (age 33); Uganda
- Origin: Kampala, Uganda
- Genres: Hip hop, Dancehall, Afrobeats, urban fusion
- Occupations: Singer, songwriter, poet, mental health advocate
- Years active: 2015–present
- Label: Afro Connect Entertainment
- Spouse: Mabel Namakula (m. 2026)

Musolo David (born May 5, 1993), professionally known as Buka Chimey, is a Ugandan singer, songwriter, and mental health advocate. He is known for blending hip hop, dancehall, and indigenous rhythms, and founded the live hip-hop group Bantu Clan.

== Early life and education ==
Musolo David was born on May 5, 1993, in Kampala, Uganda. He developed an interest in poetry and rap at an early age, which later transitioned into a professional music career under the stage name Buka Chimey.

== Musical career ==
Buka Chimey entered the mainstream Ugandan music industry with a distinct style utilizing live instrumentation mixed with traditional and urban rap beats. He formed Bantu Clan (Brothers Alliance Navigating Towards Unity), an independent group recognized for pioneering indigenous live hip-hop fusion in Uganda.

His breakthrough escalated after being selected to participate in the emPawa Africa talent incubator initiative organized by Nigerian artist Mr Eazi. In September 2020, following the viral reception of his single "Biluma Abayaye", he launched a social media dance challenge with a cash prize of Shs 500,000 to engage fans during the COVID-19 entertainment lockdowns.

Over his career, Chimey has collaborated with prominent Ugandan vocalists and artists, releasing notable collaborative tracks including "Mamacita" featuring Pallaso, "Walayi" with Martha Mukisa, "Sherry" with Bruno K, and "Hit & Run" with Angella Katatumba.

== Mental health advocacy ==
In the mid-2020s, Buka Chimey publicly opened up about his personal struggles with clinical depression, low self-esteem, and suicidal ideation resulting from the pressures of the creative industry. Following his recovery, he redirected a portion of his musical platform toward mental health awareness.

He organized and headlined a specialized debut concert and creative seminar designed specifically to address mental health, anxiety, and depression among performing artists and creatives in Uganda.

== Personal life ==
Buka Chimey was in a long-term cross-border relationship with his partner, Mabel Namakula (professionally known as Empress), who resides in Stuttgart, Germany. In March 2026, the couple traveled to Denmark, where they married in a private, low-key civil wedding ceremony attended by close family and friends.

== Selected discography ==
- "Biluma Abayaye" (2020)
- "Beer After Beer"
- "Mamacita" (feat. Pallaso)
- "Walayi" (with Martha Mukisa)
- "Sherry" (with Bruno K)
- "Hit & Run" (with Angella Katatumba)
