= Bruno K =

Ugandan musician, and guitarist (born 1992)

- Born: Bruno Kiggundu; 21 July 1992 (age 34); Namulonge,Wakiso, Uganda
- Citizenship: Uganda
- Education: Ndejje University; (Bachelor of Journalism and Mass Communication); Kampala German Language School; (German B2 Course)
- Occupations: Musician; vocalist; guitarist; actor; influencer

TikTok information
- Page: BRUNO K
- Followers: 1.3 million

YouTube information
- Channel: Bruno K
- Years active: 2010–present
- Genres: RnB, Reggae
- Subscribers: 48.1K
- Views: 3.4 million
- Last updated: 24 July 2025

Bruno Kiggundu (born 21 July 1992), professionally known as Bruno K, is a Ugandan musician, guitarist, actor and social advocate.

He rose to prominence after finishing second in the Airtel Trace Music Stars competition and later released singles such as Faridah, One for the Road, and Omuwala. Bruno is recognized for his vocals, guitar-playing skills, and lyrical storytelling, often inspired by personal experiences.

== Early life and education ==
Bruno K was born on July 21, 1992, to Donovan Kiggundu (father) and Cissy Kasozi (mother) in Namulonge, Wakiso District, Uganda. He is the second of three children and the only boy. He attended Kitante Primary School and Kazinga Parents School for his primary education before joining Seroma Christian High School and later St. Joseph's Senior Secondary School Naggalama for his O-level and A-level education respectively. He later pursued a bachelor's degree in Journalism and Mass Communication at Ndejje University, where his music journey began.

== Career ==
=== Music ===
Throughout his school years, Bruno participated in school music, dance, and drama activities. He began his professional music career in university after forming the Pearl Music band with four friends. He was later discovered by MC Kats while performing at Centenary Park, who encouraged him to join the Airtel Trace Music Stars competition. Bruno finished as the runner-up in the Ugandan edition, which marked the start of his professional journey.

In 2015, Bruno released his first major single, "Where You Been At," followed by a series of hits including "One for the Road," "Faridah," "Omuwala," and "Leero Mbaga." His guitar skills and emotive delivery contributed to his visibility in Uganda’s music scene. In 2020, he signed with Black Market Records, but the partnership soured over contractual disputes, leading to a legal battle.

In 2025, the Ugandan High Court awarded him UGX 130 million in damages after ruling that the label had infringed on his copyright and withheld royalties.

He has since joined Source Management under the mentorship of Manager Roger, aiming to revive and further his musical career. In 2025, he was featured on the song "Sherry" by Ugandan signer Buka Chimey. He continues to release music and has announced plans for a reggae EP and new collaborations.

Acting

In 2023, Bruno expanded into acting with a role in the popular Ugandan TV series Junior Drama Club produced by Allan Manzi and Nisha Kalema. He expressed optimism about growing his fan base and diversifying his income through acting.

== Musical style and influences ==
Bruno K's music is a blend of Afrobeat, R&B, and soul, often accompanied by acoustic guitar. His lyrics focus on love, heartbreak, social commentary, and personal experiences. He cites his Christian faith and personal struggles as key inspirations behind his music.

== Personal life ==
Bruno K is a born-again Christian. He embraced Christianity during a difficult period in his life, marked by emotional distress following a failed relationship. He regularly attends Phaneroo Fellowship and attributes his spiritual healing to Apostle Grace Lubega.

He is a father to three children. His daughter, Briella, was born to his partner, Racheal Nasasira, who died of skin cancer in 2021. Bruno faced public scrutiny over her death but denied allegations of neglect, clarifying that her family was well-off and had provided adequate medical care.

Bruno has been candid about his past struggles, including surviving COVID-19, dealing with abusive relationships, and overcoming career setbacks. He has used his platform to speak out on men's rights, emotional abuse, and mental health.

In 2026, Kiggundu enrolled in intensive German language courses at the German Language School Kampala, citing a desire to expand his professional horizons and creative opportunities abroad.

== Philanthropy ==
In 2021, Bruno K gained attention for supporting two young boys who had been publicly humiliated on national TV due to body odor during a talent show. He tracked them down, offered support, and pledged to be a mentor in their lives.

== Controversies ==
Bruno was involved in a public dispute with US-based businesswoman Jalia Nassolo over a missed music video shoot. He claimed miscommunication and logistical delays, while she alleged unprofessional conduct. The matter sparked debate on artist-client relations.

He also faced controversies with Black Market Records over unfair contracts, copyright infringements, and YouTube takedowns. He won multiple court rulings affirming his ownership rights over his music.

== Discography ==
- One for the Road
- Faridah
- Omuwala
- Leero Mbaga
- Ntaawa
- Nkooye Okulowoza
- Ffena
- Ebiro Bya Love
- Akaboozi
- Wanokiriza

== Awards ==
HiPipo Music Awards (Nominated & Featured Artist)

Copyright Court Ruling – Awarded UGX 130 million for copyright infringement (2025)

== Associated artists ==
- Kabuye SSemboga
- Nina Roz
- John Blaq
- A Pass
- Don MC
- Eddy Kenzo
- Spice Diana
