= Paddyman =

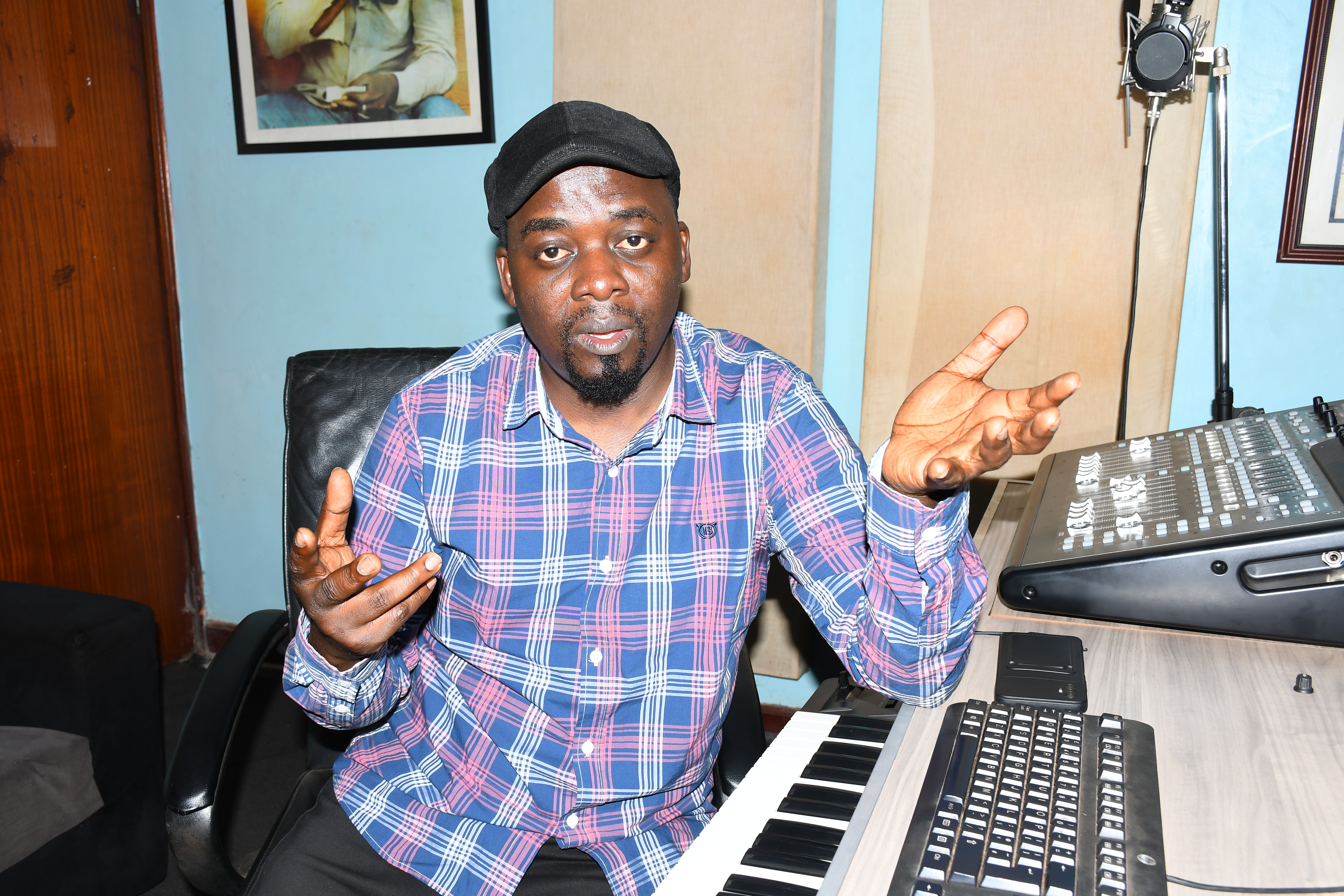

Background information
- Born: Paddy Kayiwa Mukasa; 19 December 1983 (age 42); Uganda
- Occupation: Music producer
- Years active: 2005–present

Paddy Kayiwa Mukasa, whose professional name is Paddyman, is a Ugandan music producer. He has produced songs for almost every top musician in Uganda. He has worked on many songs widely regarded as classics

== Produced works ==
Paddyman's hits include Valu Valu by DR Jose Chameleone, Banyabo by Rema Namakula, Birowoozo by Iryn Namubiru, Wanimba by Eddy Kenzo, Survivor by Judith Babirye, Pressure Ya Love by Chosen blood and Walden, Bamuyita YESU by Pr wilson bugembe, agenze by Bebecool, trouble by Bebecool, maama mbile by Bobiwine and juliana, Bada by Bobiwine, kiwani by Bobiwine, Bibuuzo, time bomb, ayagala mulasi by Bobiwine. Abakyala bazira, sooka osabe by Jamal.

Bilowooza, Nabulo, Kabi Kii, Tebiba bingi , kawoowo by Iryn Namubiru,

Judith Babirye's Olugendo, yeggwe Kabaka, and many others

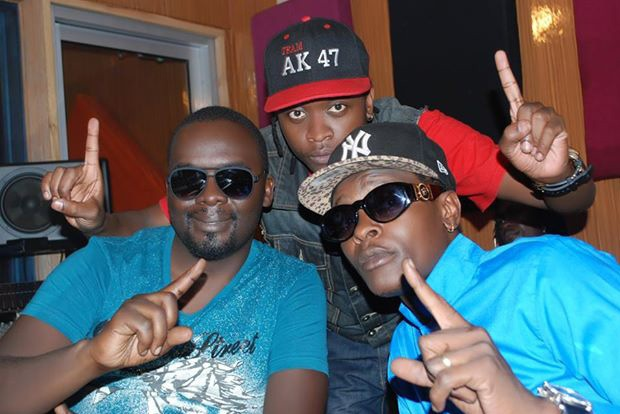
PADDYMAN

Pain killer by Aziz Azion

Omukwano gunyuma by samali matovu

Dilema by cindy mr.g and bobiwine

Valu Valu, Badilisha, Basima Ongeze by chameleon

and all these and many other songs went on to win awards

== Awards ==
Music producer Paddyman is an awarded producer

He won the "Producer of the Year" award at the 2011 PAM awards.

VIGA award Best producer of the year 2014

== Studio / company ==
Music producer paddyman is the founder owner and senior music producer at audio1 records

Audio1 Records is a studio that specializes in the production of music but also offers a variety of other services

== Paddyman's music ==
Paddyman is not only a producer, he is an artist too and some of his songs include:

- Vva mukkubo lyange
- christmas featuring Bobi wine
- ebilooto
- milelembe
- nsabira ungada
- nze naguzza
- ekimala kimala
- be humble
