= Fik Fameica =

Ugandan rapper

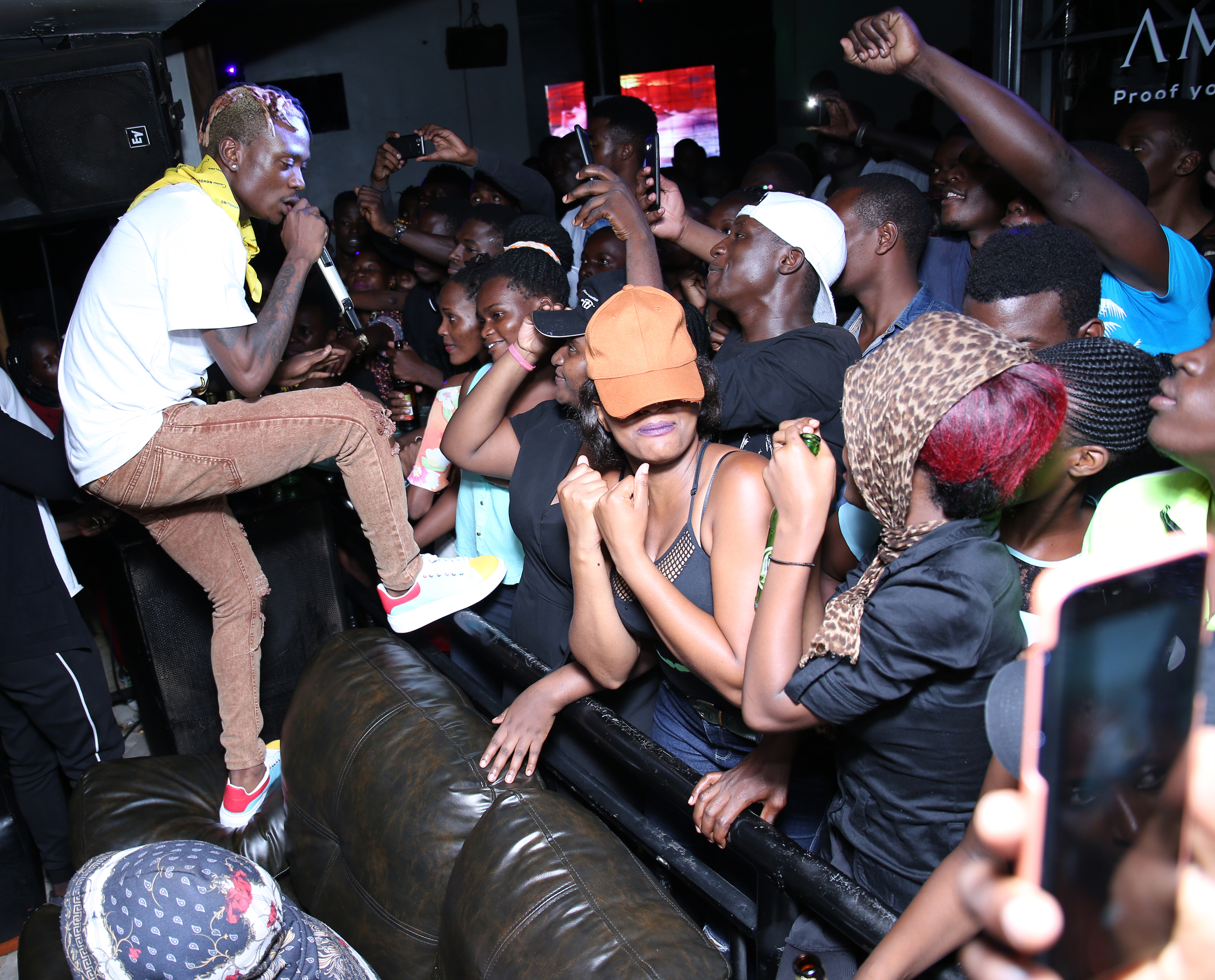

Background information
- Also known as: Fresh Bwoy, King Kong
- Born: Walukagga Shafik; 10 January 1996 (age 30); Fik Fameica, Uganda
- Genre: Hip hop
- Occupations: Rapper; songwriter
- Instrument: Rapping
- Years active: 2015–present
- Label: Fresh Gang

Fik Fameica, also known as Fresh Bwoy or King Kong (born Walukagga Shafik on 10 January 1996 in Kampala), is a Ugandan rapper and songwriter. He records in different genres including Hip-Hop, Afrobeats, Afropop and dancehall.

== Career ==
His musical debut came in 2015 with "Pistol" under the Black Man Town music label, led by a Ugandan music icon Geosteady. His later songs, "Salawo" and "Mbega Wa Bbaala" gained him a recording contract with Kama Ivien Management. His club hit "Batuwulira" followed by "Byenyenya" made him the most booked Ugandan artist in 2017. Fik won awards in Uganda and East Africa and went on to win Uganda's most popular artist in 2017. In 2018, he was crowned Breakthrough Artist, Best in Hip-Hop and Best Rap Song for his track "Kutama" at the annual HiPipo Awards.

He continued with club hits, including "Mafia", "Property", "Sconto" and "Tonsukuma". In 2019, he paired up with Nigerian superstar Patoranking for hit song "Omu Bwati"'. started a recording label called Fresh Gang Records in 2019 where they signed various artists like Mozelo Kidz, local managers like Big Sam and official dancers like Wembley Mo, & DJ Ranks Showmaster. Under this group he has released his later songs "Muko", "Tevunya" (featuring Sheebah), and "Ndi Byange" (Buligita).

== Discography ==
songs
song Title	Year
Pistol	2015
Kutama	2017
Byenyenya	2017
Kachima	2017
Sitani Tonkema Ft. Sheebah Karungi	2017
Sconto	2018
My property	2018
Tonsukuma	2018
Tubikole Ft. Vinka	2018
Mwaga Ft. Rayvanny	2018
Am Different	2019
Wansakata	2019
Tell me	2019
Muko	2020

== Recognition ==
Fameica received his first international nomination with Khaligraph Jones Sarkodie in the 2018 Nigeria Entertainment Awards in the category of Best Male Artist Non-Nigerian/Africa.

=== ZINNA Awards 2018 ===
Year	Nominee / work	Award	Result
2018	Fameica	Artist of the Year	Won
2018	Fameica	Breakthrough Artist of the Year	Won

=== Buzz Teeniez Awards 2018 ===
Year	Nominee / work	Award	Result
2018	Fameica	Teeniez Male Artist of the Year	Won
2018	Fameica	Top Hood Rapper	Won

=== HiPipo Music Awards 2018 ===
Year	Nominee / work	Award	Result
2018	Fameica	Breakthrough Artist of the Year	Won
2018	Kutama	Best Hip Hop/Rap Song	Won
2018	Sitani Tonkema	Best AfroBeat Song 2021 Best LugaFlow/Rap Song • Buligita – Fik Fameica (Winner ) Best LugaFlow/Rap Artist • Fik Fameica (Winner 2022 Best Fans Team. Winner Best LugaFlow/Rap Song. Winner	

== Associated acts ==
1. Ykee Benda
2. Roden Y Kabako
3. Chance Nalubega
4. Runtown
5. Solidstar
6. Carol Nantongo
7. Meddy
8. Alvin Kizz
9. The Ben
10. John Blaq
11. Grenade Official
12. Irene Ntale
13. Selector Jeff
14. Orezi
15. Ahdi weezy ke
16. Keem Fame Rich
17. Pinky
