= Kampala German Language School =

German language school in Uganda

- Mabirizi Complex; Kampala; Uganda

Information
- Type: Language education institution
- Language: German
- Campus: Urban
- Accreditation: Goethe-Zertifikat exam preparation

Kampala German Language School is a language education institution in Uganda that offers German courses from beginner to advanced levels. The school provides both in-person and online instruction and prepares learners for internationally recognized examinations, including the Goethe-Zertifikat. It also offers visa guidance, cultural orientation, and exchange opportunities for students preparing to study or work in Germany.

== Locations ==
The main campus is located in Kampala, Uganda, at Mabirizi Complex. The school also has campuses in Nairobi, Kenya, and Kigali, Rwanda.

== Overview ==
The school offers structured German language programs, including short intensive courses designed for rapid learning. The school provides information on travel preparation and cultural orientation for students intending to study or work in German-speaking countries.

=== Public reception ===
The school has attracted a diverse demographic of students, ranging from healthcare professionals to public figures, including Ugandan singer-songwriter Bruno Kiggundu (known as Bruno K), who enrolled in intensive language courses to expand his professional opportunities.

== Notable alumni ==
Bruno K – Ugandan musician and guitarist
