= Naira Ali =

Ugandan musician

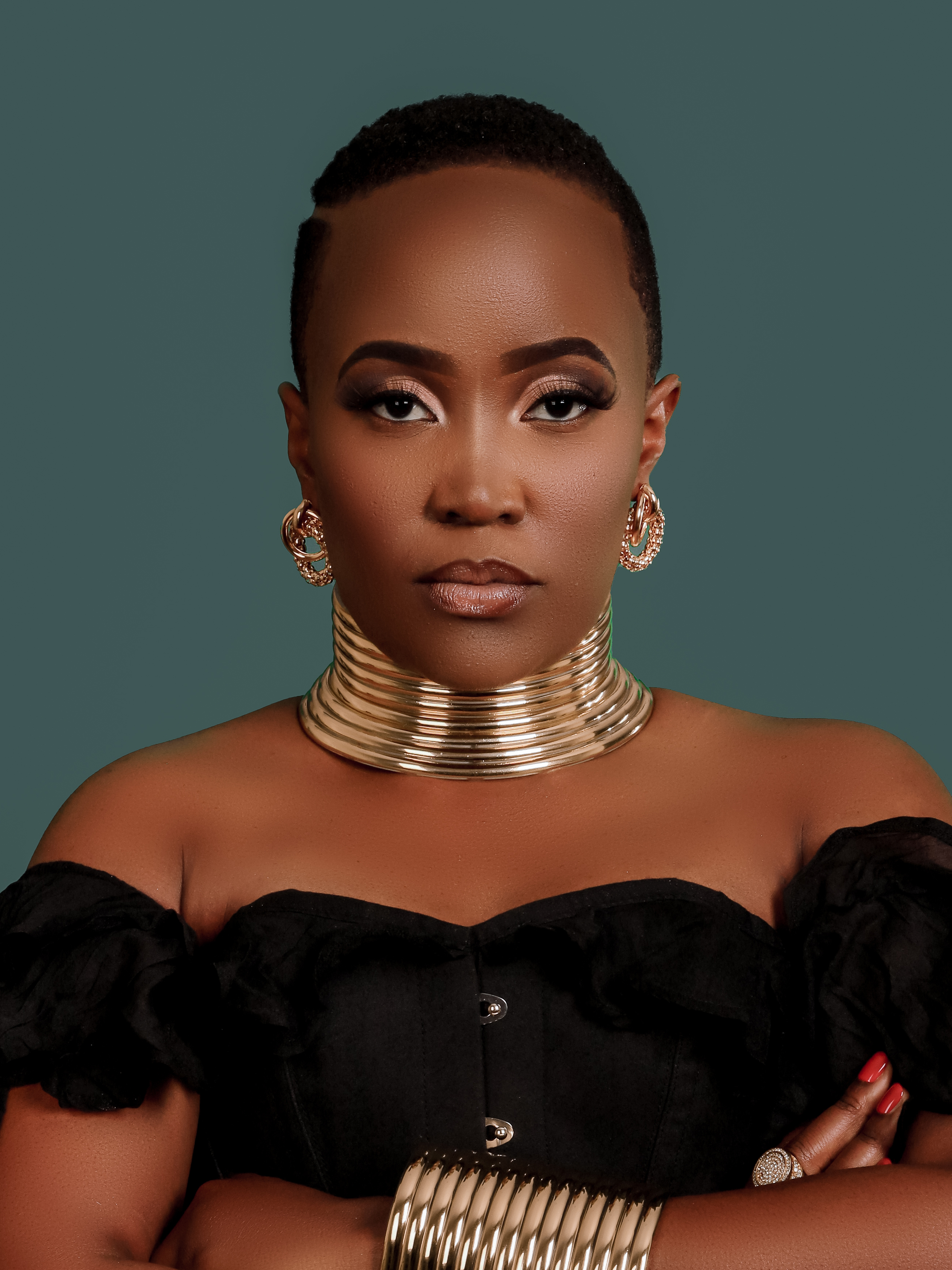

Background information
- Also known as: Naira Ali
- Born: Nabattu Naira Ali; December 5, 1988 (age 37); Masindi District
- Occupations: Songwriter, musician, performer
- Label: Purple Chord Africa

Nabattu Naira Ali (born 5 December 1988) is a Ugandan musician and performer.

== Early childhood and education ==
Nabattu was born on 5 December 1988 to Ssesanga Ali and Ssesanga Hawa, She is from the Enjovu (which means Elephant) clan in Buganda.

She got her primary education at a Muslim Girls Primary School and was awarded her Ordinary level certificate in 2004 at East High School. She was a member of the East High School entertainment club, known as "Da Bliss Club".

In 2006 she obtained her A level certificate at Kibibi Secondary School, where she served as an entertainment prefect.

In 2012 she graduated with a Bachelors of Industrial and Fine Art, majoring in graphics and fashion desiging from the Margaret Trowell School of Industrial and Fine Arts (MTSIFA) at Makerere University.

A mother, Nabattu relocated to the US in 2019.

== Career ==
=== Music career ===
She wrote and recorded her first song with Dove MC at the age of 14 in True Vine Studios and produced by Didi in 2001. She was signed by Purple Chord Africa, a music company, in 2015.

In 2019 she performed at the Ugandan North American Association (UNAA) convention which was aimed at promoting cultural diversity and economic empowerment through creating a strong diaspora community. The event was held at the Hyatt Regency Hotel in Chicago alongside other musicians, including Kenneth Mugabi, Jose Chameleon, and John Blaq.

== Discography ==
=== Music albums ===
- "Sounds of Naira Ali"
- "I am Naira Ali" was released in 2018
- "Naira Ali" was released in 2020

=== Singles ===
Her singles include;

- Okikola Otya which was her breakthrough single
- Binyuma
- Masala
- Shy Girl feat. Bafana
- Nakupenda
- Sikyalinda
- Serial Killer

== Awards and recognition ==
- In 2009, she was among the top 10 finalists for Tusker Project Fame.
- In 2009, she was the best central and southern up-and-coming artist at the Diva Music Awards.

== Other activities and achievements ==
Naira has always supported Music For Life Africa (MULIA) Foundation Children. MULIA organises annual charity concerts under different themes on which they raise funds to support vulnerable children with talents and also the Mulia Cultural Academy.

She owns Global Datacard, a graphics design and printing company.

== Controversies ==
Nabattu was born into a Muslim family; her father Ssesanga Ali allegedly denounced and disowned her for singing the song titled "Sinze" which is a gospel song. She responded to this by assuring that she "believes in God."

In 2019, Naira Ali together with other artists who included Fille Mutoni, John Blaq and Geosteady were allegedly denied US visas to perform at the UNAA convention because they lacked performing permits.

== See also ==
- Jose Chameleone
- Azawi
- Bebe Cool
