= Swangz Avenue =

Ugandan record label

- Founded: 2008
- Founder: Benon Mugumya
- Genre: Various
- Country of origin: Uganda
- Location: Kampala, Kampala
- Official website: www.swangzavenue.com

Swangz Avenue is a Ugandan record label. It was established in 2008 by Ugandan musician and record producer Benon Mugumya.

== Releases ==
The company has played a part in the Ugandan music industry, recording and releasing songs with a variety of local and global musicians. These include:

- Goodlyfe Crew
- Iryn Namubiru
- Irene Ntale
- Aziz Azion
- GNL Zamba
- Vampino
- Vinka
- Winnie Nwagi
- Azawi
- Zafaran

== Management of artists ==
Young Zee was signed 12 March 2012 by Swangz Avenue and his debut single "I Have A Dream" featuring label mate Sera was released in the same very year. In 2013, Swangz Avenue officially unveiled its new musician under the management of Swangz Avenue label, Young Zee a 14-year-old and, Sera who died. Other musicians that have ranked through Swangz Avenue are:

- Micheal Ross
- Viboyo Oweyo
- James B
- Vampino
- Benon
- Young Zee
- Vinka
- Winnie Nwagi
- Azawi
- Zafaran
- Elijah Kitaka

== Selected production discography ==
- Where You Are by Goodlyfe Crew
- Locomotive by All Stars
- God ye buddy by All Stars
- Mr. DJ by All Stars

== External links. ==
- Swangz Avenue Official Website
