= Vinka (musician) =

Ugandan musician and dancer

- Nakiyingi Veronica Lugya
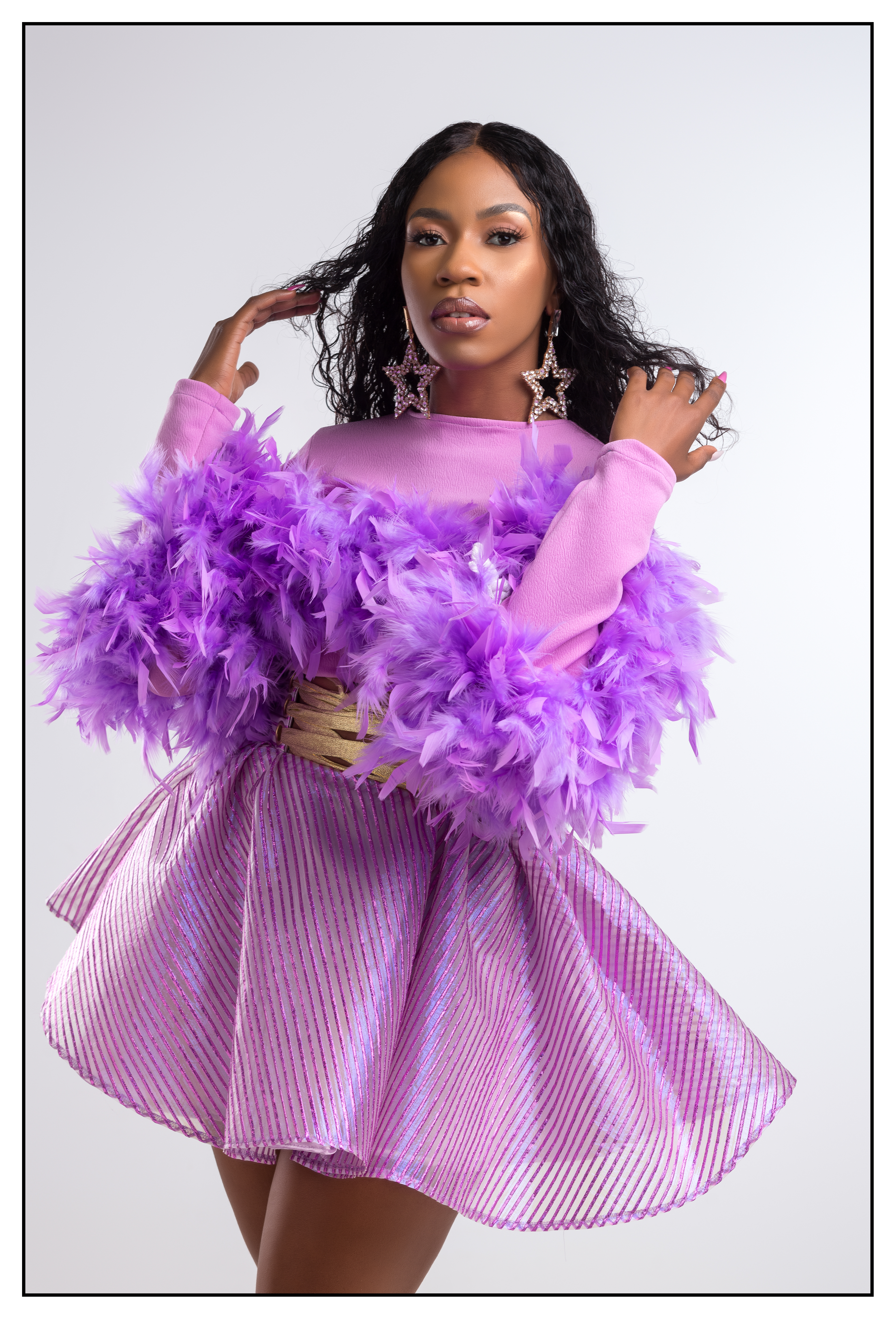
- Born: June 28, 1993 (age 33)
- Education: Rubaga Girls school; Makerere University
- Occupation: Musician
- Known for: Music

Nakiyingi Veronica Lugya (born June 28, 1993), professionally known as Vinka, is a Ugandan musical artist, dancer, singer and songwriter. She is signed under Swangz Avenue and Sony Music entertainment.

== Background and education ==
Vinka born in 1993 to Mr. and Mrs. Lugya. She grew up in Kazo with her dad and in primary 5, she went to live at her mom's place in Bweyogerere.

She went to Hormisdalen primary school in Kamwokya for her private school education. She thereafter joined Rubaga girls' school for her O' and A' level education.

She then joined Makerere University and graduated with a bachelor's degree in Tourism and Hospitality management in 2017.

== Career ==
Vinka started out as a professional dancer and worked with Jackie Chandiru, Sera, Maurice Kirya, Cindy Sanyu among others.

She later got an artist management job at Swangz Avenue, where she used to be Irene Ntale's manager.

While at Swangz Avenue, Vinka did voiceovers for artists as well as radio Jiggles and in 2015, her boss approached her and inquired if she could give music a try. She took on the challenge and started recording as an artist. In 2016, she left artist management to concentrate on music.

Her first single was "Level," followed by "Stylo," where she featured Irene Ntale, Towards the end of 2017, Vinka released her song "Malaika" which established her as a serious artist.

Since then, she has gone on to release more songs like "Chips na Ketchup", "Overdose" ft Voltage music, "Love panic", "By the way", "Omukwano Guno", "Sure", "Oluyimba Lwomwaka", "Bebe" ft Inna among others. In 2019, Vinka signed a distribution deal with Sony Music entertainment.

Also in 2019 too, she recorded a song "Bebe" with Romanian singer Inna that was digitally released by Global records.

== Controversy ==
Vinka kicked a fan who tried to touch her genitalia while performing in South Sudan.

== Family ==
Vinka gave birth to a baby girl on January 10, 2021, with fiancé Witta Nelson, a businessman and politician from Isingiro District.

== Read also ==
- Zafaran
- Swangz Avenue
- Azawi
- Sony Music Entertainment Africa
- Irene Ntale
- Cindy Sanyu
- Ugandan women in music
- Music of Uganda
