= Winnie Nwagi =

Ugandan singer and songwriter

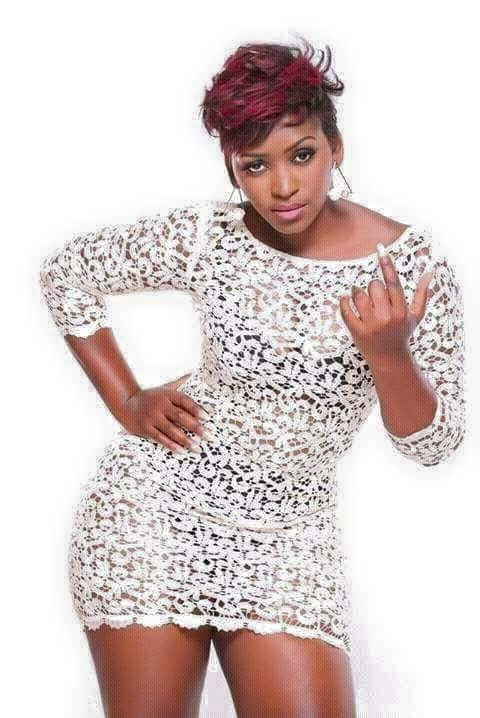
- Winnie Nwagi in 2024

Background information
- Born: Winnifred Nakanwagi; 20 July 1989 (age 37); Namasuba, Kampala, Uganda
- Origin: Namasuba, Kampala, Uganda
- Occupation: Musician
- Years active: 2016–present
- Member of: Swangz Avenue

Winnifred Nakanwagi (born 20 July, 1989), commonly known as Winnie Nwagi, is a Ugandan singer-songwriter. She is currently signed under Swangz Avenue, a music label based in Uganda.

== Early life ==
She was born in Namasuba, a commercial town north of Kampala, and raised by a single father. As a teenager, her father kicked her out, and she also dropped out of school.

She started singing at school. Continuing to perform, she struggled to record at many studios. After competing in a TV talent show, she gained the attention of music producer Benon Mugumbya, who gave her a contract with Swangz Avenue.

She has one child, a daughter.

== Music career ==
Winnifred Nakanwagi started music in her primary school as a soloist, traditional dancer and drummer of a long drum called ‘Engalabi’ in Luganda. Having no job after her secondary school, she decided to hit various studios to revive her singing talent.

She joined Monster Studios as a backup artiste and this is where she got a chance to join the Coca Cola Rated Next Talent Search where she emerged as the second runner up hence enticing Benon Mugumbya who later on signed her to Swangz Avenue on 13 October, 2014.

She released her first single titled "Embela" in 2016 and in the same year, she released her breakthrough hit, "Musawo". Her other popular songs include "Firedancer" and "Bunsonso Mola".

She performed with Afrigo Band in a live performance at Guvnor called "Friday Night Live" in April 2016.

She's still under the management of Swangz Avenue.

== Discography ==
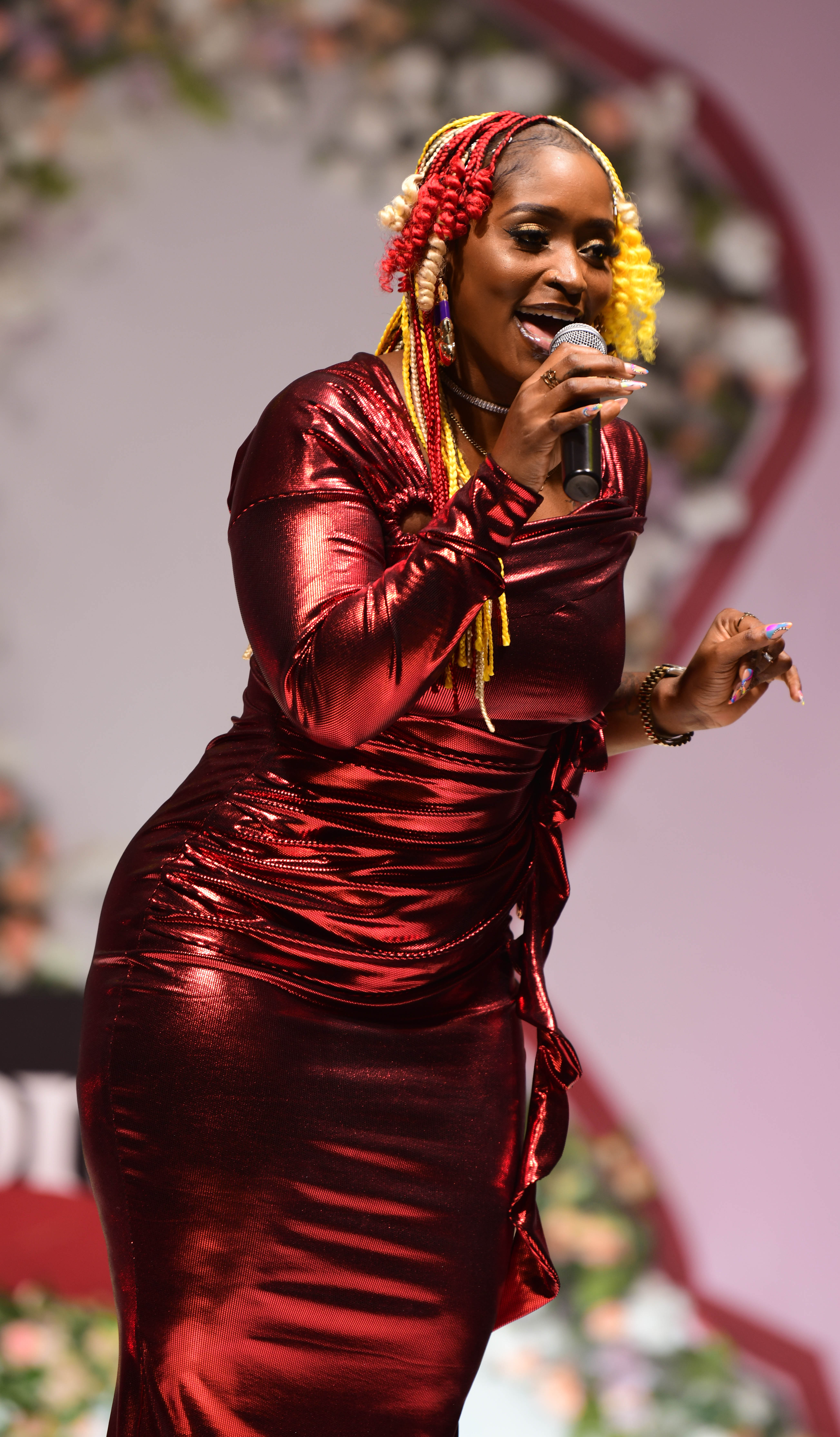

=== Albums ===
- Best of Winnie Nwagi
- Best of Winnie Nwagi (Deluxe Edition)

=== Singles ===
1. Kano koze 2. Magic

3. Detergent 4. Olukoba

5. Show me 6. Olikirabo

7. Gwobimala 8. Busonsomola

9. Munange

10. Yitayo 11. Matala

12. Sasi ku Nyama

12. Jangu

14.Musawo

15. Everything

Collabos

16. No chance Ft Rav 17. Amaaso ft Vinka

18. Bwogana ft Recho Rey

19. Sasi ku Nyam 20. Mukwano Gwo Remix ft Zulanda

21. Aabantu Banyiivu 22. Sili Taaba (I am ambition) ft Mun G

23. Science ft King Saha 24. Katono katono

25. Gwenonya 26. EmbeeraMusao

27. Kyowulira 28. Googo ft Kalifa Aganaga

29. Amaaso Urban Remix

30. Kwata Essimu ft Freeboy

31. One chance 32. Fire dancer ft Slim Prince

== Awards and recognition ==
- Break through Artiste at Uganda Entertainment Awards 2016
- Best Song of the Year at Uganda Entertainment Awards 2016 - "Musawo"
- Viral Video of the Year: "Musawo" at Club Music Video Awards
- Super Diva Stand Out Act at the Hipipo Awards 2019
- Best Breakthrough Artist at the Hipipo Awards 2017

== Other activities and achievements ==
Nwagi was given an ambassadorial role for StarTimes, Crown beverages, and Sports Club Villa, all in 2016.

She was listed on Uganda's top 100 celebrities list of 2021.
