= International University of East Africa =

Private university in Uganda

International University of East Africa (IUEA)
- Motto: Learning To Succeed
- Type: Private
- Established: 2010
- Chancellor: Amina Mohamed
- Vice-Chancellor: Emeka Akaezuwa
- Students: 3000+ (2016)
- Address: Plot 1112/1121, Kansanga Ggaba Road, Kampala, Kampala, Uganda; 00°17′05″N 32°36′24″E
- Campus: Urban
- Website: https://iuea.ac.ug/
- Location in Kampala

International University of East Africa (IUEA) is a private non-profit institution in Uganda, and is a chartered University by the Uganda National Council for Higher Education (NCHE).

In September 2022 the International University of East Africa was approved for grant of a charter by the National Council for Higher Education (NCHE).

== Overview ==
International University of East Africa is one of the newest universities in Uganda. Located in Kansanga, off the Kampala-Ggaba Road, in the southern part of the Kampala Metropolitan Area, the campus measures 20 acres (8.1 ha). The first Chancellor of IUEA was Emmanuel Tumusiime-Mutebile, who was Governor of the Bank of Uganda, the national Central Bank. The current Vice Chancellor is Emeka Akaezuewa.

== Location ==
IUEA has its main campus on a 20 acres (8.1 ha) piece of property at Kansanga, a south-eastern suburb of Kampala, Uganda's capital and largest city. Kansanga lies approximately 6 kilometres (3.7 mi), by road, southeast of the central business district of Kampala. The coordinates of the university campus are:0°17'05.0"N, 32°36'24.0"E.

== History ==
The university was founded in 2010 and began admitting students in July 2011. IUEA is licensed by the Uganda National Council of Higher Education (UNCHE), the government body that licenses institutions of higher learning in the country. The first batch of IUEA students graduated in 2014, numbering just 264.

== Faculties ==
As of July 2014, IUEA has the following faculties:

1. Faculty of Business and Management
2. Faculty of Engineering
3. Faculty of Science and Technology
4. Faculty of Law

Besides the faculties mentioned above IUEA also has a Foundation Studies Department that offers Higher Education Certificate programmes in Arts or Sciences. It also has a Centre of Languages and Professional Skills (CLAPS) that offers language and other short courses.

== Courses ==
=== Postgraduate Courses ===
- Masters of Business Administration
- Masters of information Technology

=== Undergraduate Degree Courses ===
- Bachelor of Law
- Bachelor of Business Administration
- Bachelor of Public Administration
- Bachelor of Human Resource Management
- Bachelor of Procurement and Logistics Management
- Bachelor of Tourism & Hospitality Service Management
- Bachelor of information Technology
- Bachelor of Science in Computer Science
- Bachelor of Science in Environmental Science & Management
- Bachelor of Science in Software Engineering
- Bachelor of Science in Electrical Engineering
- Bachelor of Science in Civil Engineering
- Bachelor of Science in Petroleum Engineering
- Bachelor of Science in Mobile & Satellite Communication
- Bachelor of Architecture

=== Diploma Courses ===
- Diploma in Public Administration
- Diploma in Business Administration
- Diploma in Computer Science
- Diploma in Electrical Engineering
- Diploma in Civil Engineering
- Diploma in Architecture

=== Foundation Programme ===
- Higher Education Certificate in Arts
- Higher Education Certificate in Science

=== Centre for Languages & Professional Skills ===
- Certificate in English (Beginner/Elementary/Intermediate)

== Public figures ==
=== Former Notable Staff ===
- Olubayi Olubayi : Scientist, writer and former vice-chancellor
- Emmanuel Tumusiime Mutebile : Ugandan economist and banker, chancellor

=== Notable alumni ===
- Canary Mugume: Ugandan investigative journalist
- Amini Cishugi: Congolese YouTuber and writer
- Bobi Wine: Ugandan musician and politician
- Pia Pounds: Musician

== See also ==
- KCCA
- Makindye Division
- Uganda Education
- Uganda Universities
- UG University Leaders
- Education in Uganda
- List of universities in Uganda
