= Zertifikat Deutsch für den Beruf =

German language exam

Zertifikat Deutsch für den Beruf, or ZDfB, (meaning Certificate in German for the Professions) is an internationally recognised examination which tests the level of German language ability for business and professional purposes. The ZDfB is a CEFR B2 level exam and thus builds on the Zertifikat Deutsch examination (CEFR level B1).

Generally, the ZDfB requires studying vocationally orientated German for an additional 120 lessons after obtaining the level required for passing the Zertifikat Deutsch exam.

The ZDfB was developed in the early 1990s by the Goethe Institute and the vocational schools (Pädagogischen Arbeitsstelle) and examination centres (Prüfungszentrale) of the German Volkshochschulverbands, or DVV, (the German Adult Education Centre Association). The ZDfB was developed further and organised by telc GmbH, the successor to the Weiterbildungs-Testsysteme GmbH (WBT) which existed from 1998 to 2006.

== See also ==
- Zertifikat Deutsch
- TestDaF
