= Fille Mutoni =

Ugandan recording artist

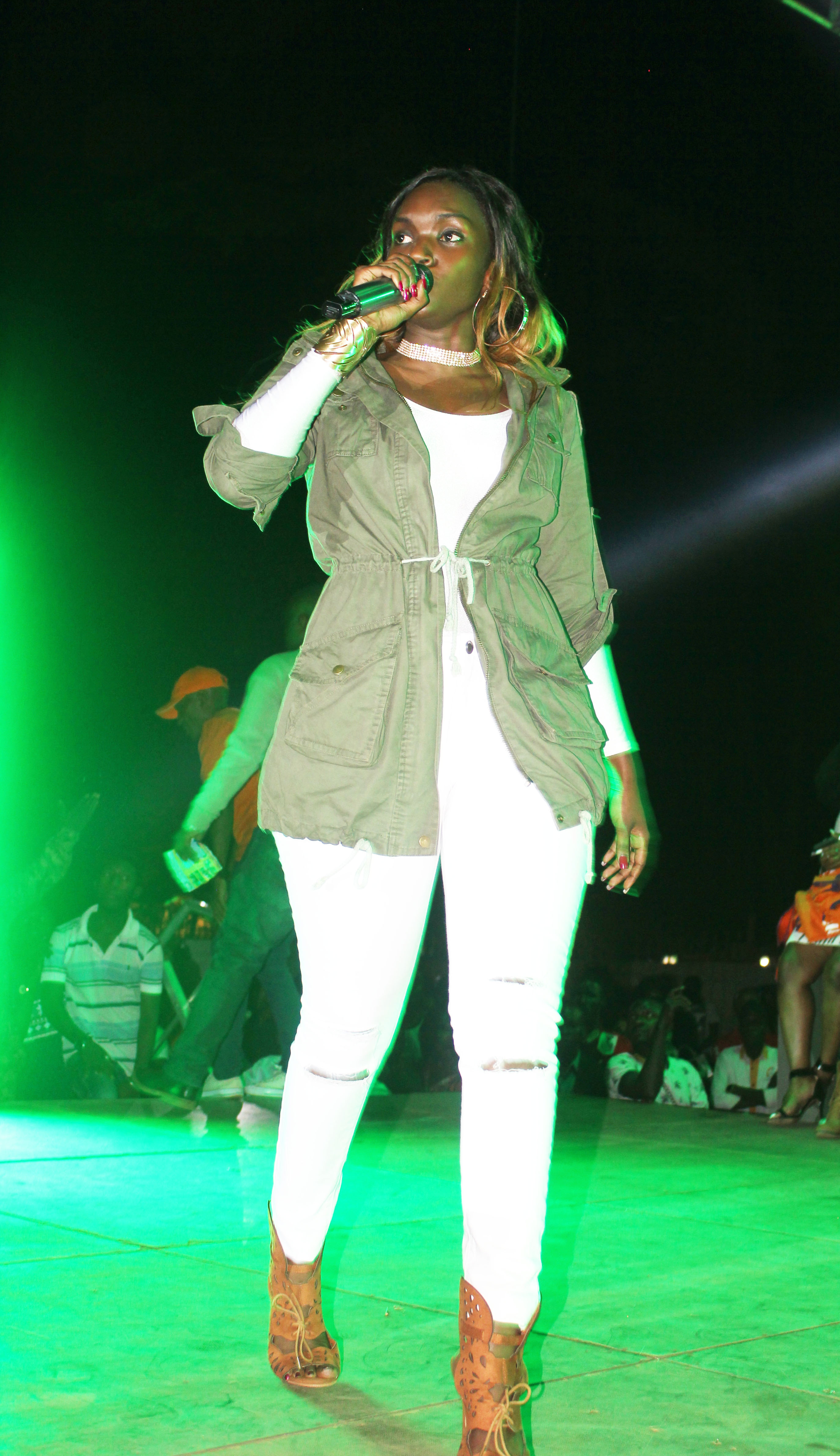
- Born: 25 July 1991 (age 35); Uganda
- Education: Standard High School (High School Diploma); St. Lawrence University (Uganda) (Bachelor of Public Administration)
- Occupation: Recording artist

Fille Mutoni (born 25 July 1991), is a Ugandan recording artist. She has collaborated with Radio and Weasel and Bruce Melodie from Rwanda, among others.

She had her first music concert in March 2018 at Golf course Hotel which was very successful. She went on a Europe tour for her "Alter Ego" album launch and visited Paris, Sweden, Germany, Denmark and Netherlands.

== Early life and education ==
Fille Mutoni was born on 25 July 1991, in the Western Region of Uganda, to Peter and Odette Rwibasira. Both her parents are of Rwandese ancestry. She attended St Helen's primary school in Mbarara before joining Nakasero Primary School and then transferred Lubiri Secondary School. She completed her A-Level studies and graduated with a High School Diploma from Standard High School, in Kampala, the capital city of Uganda. She was admitted to St. Lawrence University (Uganda), to study for a Bachelor of Public Administration degree.

== Music ==
Fille's first hit song was "Where have you been at" in 2013. She followed it with "Gat no money" and "Hello", a collaboration with Rwandese singer Bruce Melody.

She staged her first music concert in February 2018. She credits Juliana Kanyomozi and Lauren Hill as her music influencers. Prior to starting singing secular music commercially, Fille was a choir girl at Rubaga Miracle Centre.

== Discography ==
This is a partial list of the songs that Fille Mutoni has released.

- "Not About Money"
- "Where Have You Been At"
- "J'taime"
- "I Need You"
- "Anjagala"
- "I Love You"
- "Mummy"
- "Kyana"
- "Kumbaya"
- "Bye bye ex"
- "Esawa yona"
- "Falling for you "
- "Kizungu zungu"
- "Double trouble"
- "Sabula "
- "Nakupenda"
- "Mudala "
- " Squueze"

== Family and relationships ==
In her own words, Ugandan Singer Fille Mutoni says she is not much after the ‘money’ as most girls of her age are while entering a relationship, all she needs is someone who is genuine and honest. She is currently married to Kampala City celebrated Emcee, Edwin Katamba popularly known as MC Kats. The couple is blessed with a daughter.

The two at one of the 'Kadanke' fetes where a friend of hers had invited her to see teens enjoying themselves. He was emceeing and when she performed, he liked her voice, they started chatting till now. They both got engaged in 2015 at the Buzz Teeniez awards.
