= Olubayi Olubayi =

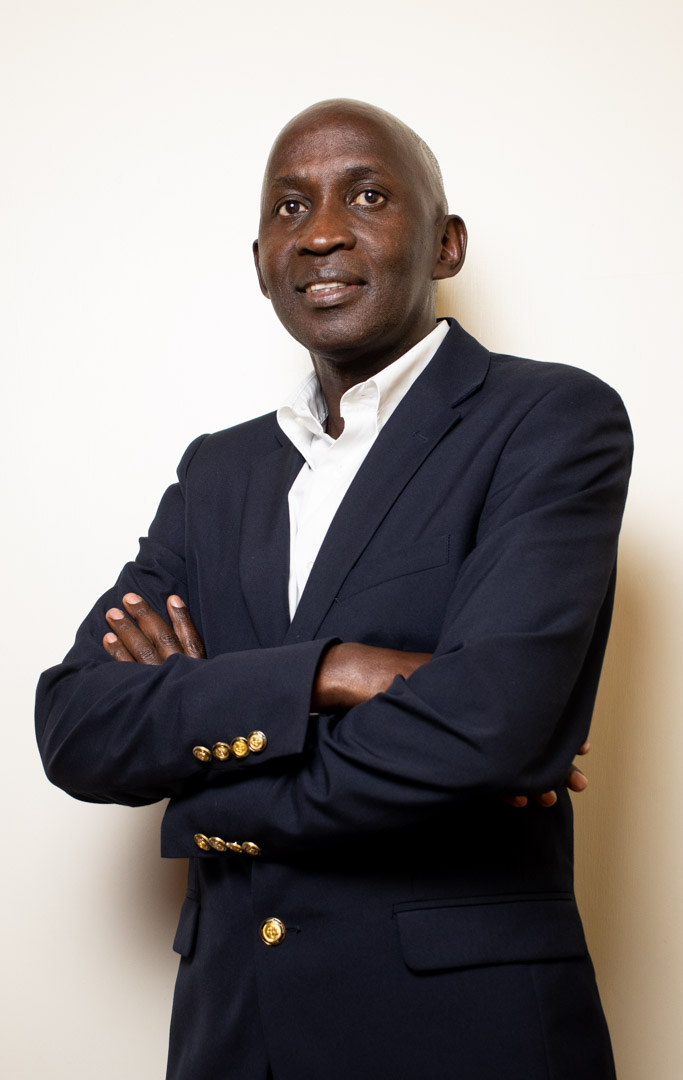
- Olubayi
- Born: November 7, 1960 (age 65)
- Education: Rutgers University–New Brunswick
- Board member of: Kiwimbi Organisation
- Children: Zuri Apoma Olubayi
- Parent(s): Chief Samson Olubayi and Mrs. Christine Apoma Olubayi

Olubayi Olubayi (born November 7, 1960) is a Kenyan academic and social entrepreneur known for his contributions to education, leadership, and sustainable development. He is the author of the book Education for a Better World, which explores the role of education in fostering democratic citizenship and promoting social progress.

Olubayi advocates for a comprehensive approach to education that includes both inclusive public education and selective elite institutions. He argues that this dual-pronged strategy, similar to models used in countries like the United States, the United Kingdom, and South Korea, is essential for promoting both equity and excellence in education.

Olubayi has held various leadership positions in the education sector, including Vice Chancellor of the International University of East Africa (IUEA) and Chief Academic Officer at Maarifa Education. He is also a member of several boards, including the University Council of Cavendish University Uganda.

In addition to his academic career, Olubayi is a social entrepreneur and has co-founded several organizations, including Kiwimbi International and the Global Literacy Project. These organizations have worked to promote literacy, education, and sustainable development in Africa and other regions.

Olubayi has published extensively on topics such as education, leadership, and social entrepreneurship. He has also served as a consultant to governments on education policy and sustainable development.

== Early life and education ==
Olubayi was born and raised in Kenya. Olubayi studied at Moding Primary School (1967 to 1969) and St. Peter's Mumias Primary School (1969 to 1970) and Museno Primary School (1970 to 1973) and then the famous Kakamega High School (1973 to 1979). Thereafter he moved to the US, where he attended SUNY Farmingdale (1981 to 1983), Florida Atlantic University (1983 to 1987), and then Rutgers University–New Brunswick (1988 to 1995).

== Career ==
He is the chief academic officer at Maarifa Education, he was the vice chancellor and president of the International University of East Africa in Uganda. He is a scientist and an expert on bacteria, education, learning, leadership and social-entrepreneurship. As a scientist and eclectic scholar, Olubayi earned his Ph.D. on bacteria-and-plant cell interactions at Rutgers University–New Brunswick, holds a research patent on the flocculation of bacteria and has published several scholarly articles in microbiology, biotechnology and social science. As an educator he taught at Middlesex College and at Rutgers University for 16 years, and has taught critical thinking in the IUEA MBA program. He has been an advisor and consultant to government officials in Kenya and South Africa, and UNDP on matters of literacy, education, biotechnology, sustainable development and global citizenship. He is an external advisor to Ph.D. students in the Oxford University-Kemri/Wellcome Trust Research Program in Kilifi, Kenya. As a social entrepreneur, Olubayi co-founded the nonprofit Kiwimbi International and the widely respected American nonprofit Global Literacy Project which sets up libraries worldwide and provides global service learning opportunities. As a thinker, he is the author of the book “Education for a Better World” and a ground breaking scholarly exploration of the emerging National-Culture of Kenya.

Olubayi is the chairman of the University Council at Cavendish University Uganda. He is a Member of the University Council of KCA University, Kenya. He worked as a consultant for the Ethnic and Race Relations Policy of National Cohesion and Integration Commission of Kenya (NCIC) in 2012 and 2013. He is a widely cited intellectual voice on “the emerging national culture of unity in Kenya” since 2007. He is also a chairman of board of management for St. Thomas Amagoro Girls High School, Busia County, Kenya.

Olubayi is the co-founder of the MUSEUM OF TESO CULTURE in Busia County Kenya. He is the co-founder of the first free public library in Busia County Kenya (Kiwimbi Library).

== Publications and presentations ==
He is the author of a seminal paper on education policy that presents what has rapidly come to be known as IDEA NUMBER TWO in education policy circles. In this paper on education policy, Olubayi provides an answer to the following development questions that perplex most Africans: “Why do African countries rely on foreign companies and foreign experts for almost all our development projects? How can we have so much natural wealth and yet be so poor? Why do we invent so little?”

The answer, according to professor Olubayi is in Africa’s failure to implement idea number two.

According to Olubayi, there are two major ideas in education policy, which are:

Idea number one is the obligation to educate all children because it is their fundamental human right as enshrined in the 1948 United Nations Universal Declaration of Human Rights.

Idea number two is the strategy of establishing and sustaining world class schools and universities for the education of the most highly gifted and highly talented citizens.

Professor Olubayi was the keynote speaker at the Africa-wide annual democracy dialogues (the Davos of Africa) hosted by the Goodluck Jonathan Foundation in Benin City on 13th June 2024. He presented his IDEA NUMBER TWO on Africa’s strategic need for world-class schools and world-class universities. In addressing Africans, Olubayi says, “let us not do what the developed world tells us to do, let us do what they do.”

=== Books ===
- The Children Who Made a Magical Balloon. Agua Mizu Publishing. 2020. ISBN 978-9966137692.
- Mindset: A Children's Book. Agua Mizu Publishing. 2020. ISBN 978-9914700183.
- Education for a Better World. CreateSpace Independent Publishing Platform. 2019. ISBN 978-1461076865.
- Wealth Not Income. Global Literacy Press. 2005. ISBN 1-59899-007-1.
- The Interactions of Vegetative and Flocculated Azospirillum(plus/minus Rhizobium) with Phaseolus" in agriculture. Rutgers University Press. 1995.
- Olubayi, Olubayi (2013). "National Peace and Stability: The Role of Kenyans in the Diaspora". In Njogu, Kimani (ed.). Youth and Peaceful Elections in Kenya. Twaweza Communications. pp. 121–135.
- Olubayi, Olubayi (2011). "Thinking of Race in the Age of DNA". In Ramsamy, Edward; Tate, Gayle (eds.). The Black Experience in America Dubuque. Kendall Hunt Publishing Company. pp. 16–25.
- C.A, Neyra; L.A, Atkinson L.A; O, Olubayi, Novel microbial technologies for enhancement of plant growth and biocontrol of fungal diseases in crops, vol. 31, CIHEAM, pp. 447–456
- Olubayi, Olubayi (1999). "The place of Science in Africana Studies". In Bethel, Leonard (ed.). Africana: An Introduction and Study. Kendall Hunt Publishing Company. pp. 542–560. ISBN 0-78726-252-8.

=== Journals and research papers ===
- Olubayi, Olubayi (2024). "Africa must create centers of educational excellence for innovation and development". African Journal of Reproductive Health. 28 (7).
- "The Emerging National Culture of Kenya: Decolonizing Modernity". Journal of Global Initiatives: Policy, Pedagogy, Perspective. 2. Kennesaw State University. 2007.
- Olubayi, Olubayi; Caudales, Rodulio; Atkinson, Amy; Neyra, Carlos (1998). "Differences in Chemical Composition between nonflocculated and flocculated Azospirillum brasilense Cd". Canadian Journal of Microbiology. 44 (4): 386–390. doi:10.1139/w98-002.
- Neyra, Carlos; Atkinson, Amy; Olubayi, Olubayi (1995), "Coaggregation of Azospirillum with other Bacteria: Basis for Functional Diversity", Azospirillum VI and Related Microorganisms, vol. 37, NATO ASI series, pp. 429–440, doi:10.1007/978-3-642-79906-8_48, ISBN 978-3-642-79908-2
- Olubayi, Olubayi; Neyra, Carlos (1994), "Cell aggregation and differential modes of attachment of Azospirillum brasilense cells to plant roots and to sand", Proceedings of the North Eastern Section of the American Society of Plant Physiologists, Binghampton, New York, p. 26
- Neyra, Carlos; Olubayi, Olubayi; Zaurov, David; Duell, R.W (1994), "Development of bacterial inoculants for use on Turf, Range and Pasture Grasses." (PDF), Third Annual Rutgers Turf Grass Symposium, p. 26
- Olubayi, Olubayi; T.M, Ford; Neyra, Carlos (1993), Palacios, Rafael; Mora, Jaime; Newton, Wiliam (eds.), Growth responses of several grass species to inoculations with Azospirillum brasilense strain Cd., Current Plant Science and Biotechnology in Agriculture, vol. 17, p. 737, doi:10.1007/978-94-017-2416-6, ISBN 978-90-481-4255-2
- Olubayi, Olubayi; Daie, Jaleh (1998), Relationship between transplant shock, water statusand recovery in pepper seedlings., p. 55

External videos
- Prof Olubayi Speech at Africa-wide annual democracy day dialogues on YouTube
