= Hannz Tactiq =

- Born: Hannington Muhumuza Wacha
- Other names: Producer Hannz; Hannz Tactiq; Hannz Tactic
- Relatives: Fred Wacha (Biological Father); Linda Peel (Mother); Mr John Turwomwe (Adoptive Father)
- Musical career
- Genres: Dancehall; Hip hop
- Occupations: DJ; Music producer
- Instruments: guitar; bass; piano
- Years active: 2009–present
- Label: Hannz Records

Hannington Muhumuza Wacha, also known as Producer Hannz or Hannz Tactiq, is a Ugandan hip hop and Dancehall producer and DJ. He is the CEO of Hannz Records located in Makindye, Kampala.

== Career ==
In 2017, Hannz and Dave Dash started an online radio station called “IAM RADIO” aimed at creating awareness about drugs among the youth, sharing real life stories in order to help and educate them, as well as promoting Ugandan music.

== Discography ==
Year	Song Title	Musician(s)	Role
2009	"Koi Koi"	GNL Zamba	Producer, Album Mixer
2010	"Step Pon Floor"	Atlas, Mighty Son	Writer, Producer, Album Mixer
2012	"Owakabi"	Jose Chameleone	Co-Writer, Producer, Mixer
2013	"Bring it On"	Jose Chameleone	Producer, Mixer
2013	"Gira Tugire"	Mun G	Producer, Mixer
2014	"Tebakusobola"	Yung Mulo	Producer, Album Mixer
2015	"Muliwa"	Apass	Producer, Mixer
2015	"Follow My Rules (Omanyi Ozzina)"	Mun G, Nutty Neithan	Producer, Mixer
2015	"Kanda [Chap Chap]"	Young Cardamon, HAB	
	"Bwekiri"	Rabadaba	
	"Mukyamu"	Rabadaba	
	"Sesetulla"	Baboon Forest Entertainment, Mun G	
	"Teli Aluleeta"	GNL Zamba	
	"Breathe-Na-Na-Na-Na-Na"	Jackie Ft. DJ Langona	
	"Nkwata Nkwata"	Mighty Son	
	"Shankarabarabi"	Mun G	
	"Banyirira-Kampala-Gals"	Allan Toniks	
	"Omu ku Omu"	Navio ft. Yung Mulo	

== Filmography ==
Year	Film/TV Series	Role	Notes
2016	Queen of Katwe	Film Soundtrack Music arranger and Producer	Walt Disney production
2014	Bullion Van	Film Soundtrack and music Producer	Feature Film
2010	Kakibe Kki TV Series	Soundtrack	TV series on NTV Uganda

== Awards and nominations ==
Awards & Nominations
Year	Award	Category	Result	Ref
2014	HiPipo Music Awards	Best Audio Producer	Won	
