= Goethe-Zertifikat C2 =

Goethe-Zertifikat C2: Großes Deutsches Sprachdiplom
- Awarded for: High-level German language ability (C2 level)
- Description: A certificate of German language proficiency
- Sponsored by: Goethe-Institut
- Country: Germany
- Established: 2012 (as Goethe-Zertifikat C2); Zentrale Oberstufenprüfung (ZOP) was established earlier and integrated into the C2 exam.
- Website: www.goethe.de/en/spr/kup/prf/prf/gzc2.html

The Goethe-Zertifikat C2: Großes Deutsches Sprachdiplom (formerly Zeugnis über die Zentrale Oberstufenprüfung) is a Goethe-Institut certificate proving high-level German language ability.

The Zentrale Oberstufenprüfung (pronounced [t͡sɛnˈtʁaːlə oːbɐˈʃtuːfn̩ˌpʁyːfʊŋ]; ZOP) has been integrated into the Goethe-Zertifikat C2 as of 1 January 2012. The ZOP is rated at level C2 of the Common European Framework of Reference for Languages (CEFR), the highest of the CEFR levels, signalling a level of language ability comparable to an educated native speaker. The exam Zentrale Oberstufenprüfung requires the examinee to understand difficult texts and to communicate eloquently in both spoken and written language.

Possessing a ZOP certification is considered valid proof of German language proficiency for anyone seeking entry into a German Hochschule or university. It is also valued as a qualification proving mastery of German in business contexts.

The Zentrale Oberstufenprüfung may only be administered to people at least 16 years old who have not learned German as a native speaker. The requirement for a person undertaking the ZOP is estimated at around 1,000–1,200 hours of German language lessons.

== See also ==
- Zertifikat Deutsch
- Zertifikat Deutsch für den Beruf
- Green diploma (Grünes Diplom for German teachers)
- Learning application to prepare Goethe
