= Aziz Azion =

Ugandan musical artist

- Born: Aziz Mukisa; 27 July 1986 (age 40); Fort Portal, Kabarole, Uganda
- Genre: R&B, Afrobeat, Zouk
- Occupations: Singer, Songwriter, Entrepreneur
- Instruments: Acoustic guitar, drums
- Years active: 2006–present
- Labels: Maestro Studios, WestEnd Entertainment, Shotyme Music

Aziz Mukisa, professionally known by his stage name Aziz Azion (pronounced [ʕaziːz] á-ʐðɲ), is a Ugandan R&B singer-songwriter, guitarist and musician. He was born Aziz Mukisa on 27 July 1986 in Fort Portal, Uganda, and raised in Kampala where he attended his early school program before making his move into the music industry at an early age. Popularly known as "the guitar emperor", Aziz has graced the Ugandan and East African music charts with the songs 'Yegwe', 'Nkumila Omukwano', 'Nakupenda', 'Oxygen', 'Beera Nange', 'Nzikiriza', 'Pain Killer', and 'Yo Love', among others. Popular music promoter and veteran disc spinner DJ Erycom while appearing on a TV Show, he said that "Leero Monday" was the very first song composed and sung by Aziz Azion in the year 2007.

== Music style and career ==
Aziz's music takes on the R&B music style with noticeable influences from Afrobeat and Afropop. He is currently signed to Shotym Music Entertainment, his own music label which he founded in 2020 with a goal of taking his music career to the next level. He learned how to play the guitar in 1998 in a local Kadongo Kamu band called 'Makuge Kandongo Kamu group'. He later joined late Paulo Kafeero's group called Kulabako Guitar Singer, where he spent one year and a half before moving to Kato Lubwama's Diamond Productions for two years. He then joined Eagles' production where he spent a couple of months before he and his bandmates agreed to form a band that would play for all artists thus the formation of Jeckaki Band. Aziz backed up instrumentally in the band where he was a back up guitarist for a number of big names in music such as Jose Chameleon. Their first international stage performance was in 2005 during Chameleon's European tour. Jeckaki performed with Jose Chameleon in Sweden, Denmark, Norway, Belgium and Finland.

However, his music breakthrough came in 2008 following the release of his hit single, 'Nkumila Omukwano'. The singer has collaborated with artists like GNL Zamba on the R&B/Hip hop-driven 'Nakupenda', which was featured on his "Wampisa" album, Juliana, Goodlyfe, Mariam Ndagire, GNL, Swangz Avenue, Rabadaba and Pastor Wilson Bugembe.

== Oxygen album ==
In 2011, Azion released his second music album Oxygen at Kati Kati, Calendar Rest Hotel, and KK beach. The album included songs like Oxygen and Baliwa.

== Discography ==
- Nkumila Omukwano
- My Oxygen
- Uganda the pearl of Africa
- Wampisa
- Mataala

=== Studio albums ===
1. Wampisa
2. My Oxygen
3. Beera Nange
4. Nakupenda

== Music Award ==
- 2011 – PAM Awards – Best R&B Artiste

== See also ==
- List of Ugandan musicians
