= Zertifikat Deutsch =

- Acronym: ZD
- Type: Internationally recognized German language exam
- Administrator: Goethe-Institut (now called Goethe-Zertifikat B1); Österreichisches Sprachdiplom (ÖSD); Schweizer Erziehungsdirektorenkonferenz (EDK); telc GmbH
- Skills tested: Proof of German proficiency for various purposes; Separate version for adolescents: Zertifikat Deutsch für Jugendliche (ZD j)
- Regions: Germany
- Languages: German
- Prerequisites: Estimated 300 to 600 hours of instruction

The Zertifikat Deutsch (ZD) is an internationally recognized exam of German language ability. It tests for a level of ability equivalent to level B1 in the Common European Framework of Reference for Languages (CEFR) scale. Candidates typically need between 300 and 600 hours of instruction in German in order to obtain the necessary fluency to pass the Zertifikat Deutsch exam.

Some organizations have changed the name of this exam, for example the Goethe-Institut, which has called it Goethe-Zertifikat B1 since May 2013, but others still use the original name.

The Zertifikat Deutsch exam is tailored to the needs of adult students of German, regardless of whether they are inside or outside a German-speaking country. Another exam, the Zertifikat Deutsch für Jugendliche (ZD j), is tailored to adolescent students of German.

The Zertifikat Deutsch is the result of a joint collaboration between the Goethe Institute, the Österreichisches Sprachdiplom (ÖSD), the Schweizer Erziehungsdirektorenkonferenz (EDK) and WBT Weiterbildungs-Testsysteme gGmbH, later renamed telc GmbH (i.e.The European Language Certificates).

== See also ==
- Zentrale Oberstufenprüfung
- Common European Framework of Reference for Languages
