= McAfrika =

Burger sold by McDonald's

The McAfrika was a hamburger sold by the fast food restaurant chain McDonald's in Norway and Denmark as a Limited Edition Olympic Games Burger. It attracted significant public criticism as a result of its name and the timing of its launch.

== Product ==
The McAfrika sandwich contained beef, cheese, and tomatoes wrapped in pita bread. McDonald's claimed it was based upon an authentic African recipe.

== Public reaction ==
The McAfrika was released in 2002, just as a major famine was occurring in Malawi, Zimbabwe, Mozambique, Zambia, Lesotho and Swaziland. The name of the burger was immediately criticized for being grossly insensitive, especially since it was released in Norway, one of the richest nations in the world.

Norwegian Church Aid and the Norwegian Red Cross, which were both conducting humanitarian operations in southern Africa at the time, said that McDonald's decision was insensitive, crass and ill-considered. Linn Aas-Hansen said that "it's inappropriate and distasteful to launch a hamburger called McAfrika when large portions of southern Africa are on the verge of starvation." CARE Norway demanded that McDonald's withdraw the burger. In particular, Norwegian Church Aid protested the McAfrika burgers by giving out "catastrophe crackers" to customers entering Norwegian McDonald's outlets.

Support for McDonald's came from the organization African Youth in Norway who appreciated Africa's name being used in a positive manner instead of as a continent of war and poverty.

== McDonald's response ==
McDonald's did not withdraw the burger, instead offering it until September 2002, just as planned in its campaign. However, as a conciliatory gesture, it allowed aid agencies to put up posters and donation boxes in McDonald's restaurants where the McAfrika was being sold. Furthermore, McDonald's spokesperson Margaret Brusletto apologized for the timing of the launch, saying "We acknowledge that we have chosen an unfortunate time to launch this new product."

== 2008 re-launch ==
The McAfrika was re-launched in 2008 to promote the 2008 Beijing Olympics for a short time, and attracted a similarly negative response.

== See also ==
- Criticism of McDonald's
