= Angella Katatumba =

Ugandan musician (b. 1989)

- Born: 21 February 1989 (age 37); Nairobi, Kenya
- Education: Katatumba Academy; Oxford Brookes University; Belmont Senior Secondary School in Vancouver, B.C Canada
- Occupations: Hotel diplomaté md and ceo katatumba properties ltd, singer, song writer and brand influencer
- Musical career
- Genres: Pop; Afropop; soul; R&B
- Years active: 2010–present

Angella Franklin Keihongani Katatumba (born 21 February 1989) is a Ugandan singer, songwriter, philanthropist, diplomat and businesswoman.

== Early life ==
Angella was born on 21 February 1989 in Nairobi, Kenya. She is the daughter of H.E Prof. Boney Mwebesa Katatumba, the Honorary Consul of Pakistan in Uganda, and Gertrude Katatumba, the proprietor of AFK Beauty Clinic Kabalagala. She has a sister named Rosemary and seven brothers: Allan, Dennis, Rugiirwa (Angella's twin brother), Colin (deceased), Ken, Ian, and Jay.

Angella received her primary education in Uganda at the Katatumba Academy before attending Belmont Senior Secondary School in Vancouver, B.C., Canada, where she earned a diploma in Public Relations. She further pursued her studies at Oxford Brookes University in England, obtaining Bachelor of Arts degrees in Economics and Law. At the same institution, Angella continued her education and earned a master's degree in International Management/Public Relations. Subsequently, she relocated to Chicago, Illinois, where she gained professional experience.

Returning to Uganda, Angella assumed the role of managing director at her late father's establishment, Hotel Diplomaté, in 2017, following her father's death.

She served as the Acting Honorary Consul of Pakistan in Uganda for two years until a new appointee was chosen by the President of Pakistan, H.E Mamnoon Hussain.

Beyond her involvement in the music industry, Angella established the Angella Katatumba Development Foundation (AKDF), an NGO that encompasses her various music-related projects.

== Career ==
In 2010, the British Council appointed Angella as the Climate Change ICON in Uganda.

On 23 May 2016, Angella was invited by the United Nations Secretary-General Ban-Ki Moon, to attend and perform at the first-ever UN World Humanitarian Summit in Istanbul, Turkey.

On 28 November 2016, Angella was invited by the African Union to represent Uganda at the 4th Annual Humanitarian Symposium in Nairobi, Kenya.

On 9 September 2017, Angella had her first European headline performance in Austria, dubbed 'African Gala' at Längenfeldgasse 13–15 Street 1120, Vienna.

== Discography ==
- Supernatural Girl (2020)
- I Live For You (2021)
- Wendi (2022)
