= Irene Ntale =

Ugandan singer, songwriter and guitarist (born 1988)

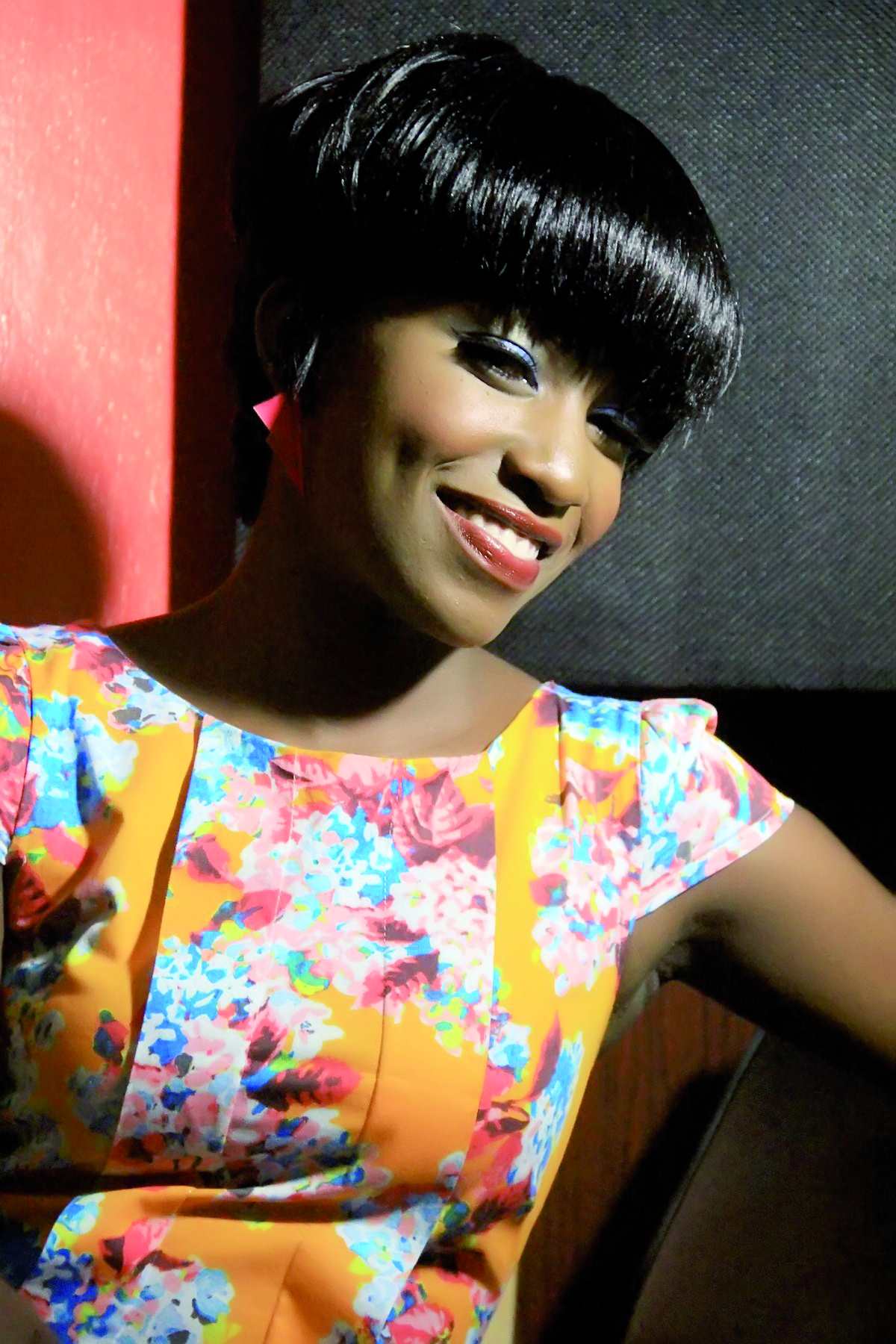

Background information
- Born: 30 January 1989 (age 37); Uganda
- Genres: Afropop; R&B; reggae
- Occupations: Singer, songwriter, music producer

Irene Ntale (born 30 January 1988) is a Ugandan singer, songwriter, and guitarist. She sings RnB, reggae, and acoustic soul.

== Early life and education ==
Ntale was born on 30 January 1989 to George William Ntale and his wife. She started singing at school and in the church choir where she also learned how to play the guitar. She went to Kitante primary school, Kitante Hill School for O-level, and Makerere High, now Migadde College, for A-level. She earned a Bachelor of Procurement and Logistics Management degree at Kyambogo University.

== Music ==
She started singing at school and in the church choir where she also learned how to play the guitar. She used to perform at shows, singing other artists' songs, until she went to Swangz Avenue. Ntale has had hit songs since, like "Gyobera", "Love letter" a collaboration with Bebe Cool, "Stay with me", "Nkubukinze" and "Olindaba".

She has been hosted on Focus on Africa. She is the campaign ambassador for the Red Card to Drunk Driving campaign by Uganda Breweries Limited.

== Universal Music records ==
In early 2019, after numerous visits to Lagos, Nigeria, it was rumored that Ntale was negotiating a deal with Universal Music Group Nigeria, and on 21 August 2019, she signed a record deal with Universal Music Group Nigeria, making her the first Ugandan artiste to be signed to the record label. The company posted a welcome message to Ntale on their official Instagram page stating "Welcome to the Family!! Uganda’s 1st Lady @irene_ntale The journey has begun…".

Ntale released her debut single under the Universal Music imprint, titled "Nyamba", a song in her local dialect, which means "Help Me".

== Awards and recognition ==
- Best Female Breakthrough Artist 2013, Hipipo Music Awards
- Best Female artist, Buzz Teeniez Awards 2014, 2015

== Personal life ==
On 17 October 2025, Ntale married her longtime partner Vincent Kalibbala in Kampala.
