= Samalie Matovu =

Ugandan musician

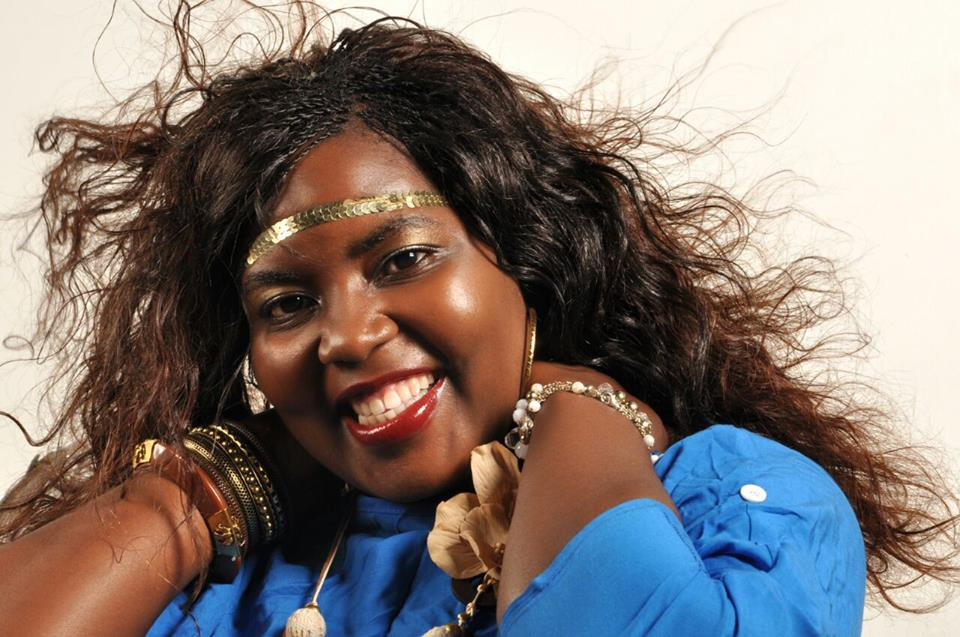

Samalie Matovu is a Ugandan musician. At the 2010 Diva Awards she was nominated for New Diva of the Year, Diva Video of the Year and Diva Song of the Year. At the 2010 PAM Awards she was awarded Song of the Year for "Omukwano Gunyuma".
