= Benon Mugumbya =

Ugandan musician and music producer (born 1980)

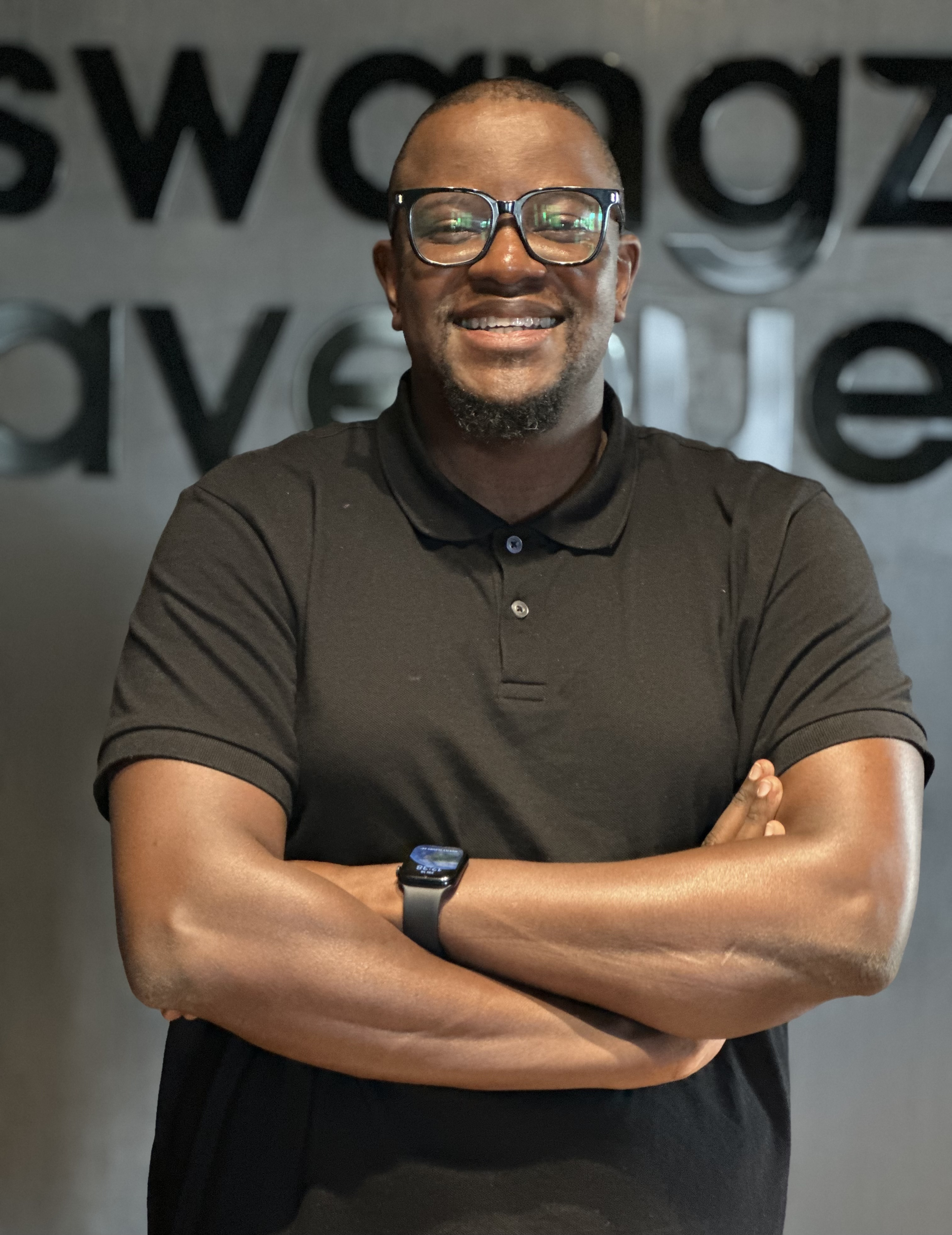
- Background Information
- Born: December 13, 1980 (age 45); Uganda
- Citizenship: Uganda
- Occupations: Music producer, musician
- Organization: Swangz Avenue/Swangz Music Academy
- Known for: Music
- Board member of: Buganda Tourism Board
- Website: https://academy.swangzavenue.com/

Benon Mugumbya is a Ugandan musician and music producer. He was one half of the singing duo "Benon and Vamposs". He is the founder of Swangz Avenue.

== Early life and education ==
Benon Mugumbya was born on 13 December 1980 to Benon Mugumbya and Florence Mugumbya. His father died two weeks before he was born. He started singing and performing in his primary school days at Budo Junior School, active in the school choir and drama club both in his O-level at Ndejje Secondary and A-Level at Namasagali college. It's here that he met Elvis Kirya who later adopted a stage name Vamposs. The duo joined voices right from school and launched their career as ‘Benon & Vamposs’ with help from a friend, mentor and producer, Steve Jean in 2001.

Over time Benon developed a passion for producing music. However, with very little skills in playing any musical instrument it wasn't going to be easy but the mentorship from producers Aydee and Pato helped a great deal. he learnt a lot from these two while working at their Goodenuff studios in Makindye and in 2006 he was offered a job at Fenon records where he worked with Producer Steve Jean.

Two years later, Benon started his own studio Swangz Avenue working/producing songs for artists like Blu 3, Radio and Weasle, Juliana, GNL, Mun G, Bobi Wine, Irene Namubiru, Navio, Vamposs, Lillian Mbabazi, Michael Ross, Viboyo, Rabadaba, Bebe Cool, Aziz Azion, Keko and many more bringing a new sound to Uganda’s Airwaves and winning a number of accolades including The Pam Award Producer of the Year 2010 and The Buzz Teeniez Award for Beat Maker of the Year 2010.

In 2011 Benon Released his very first solo album entitled “Olunaku Olupya (New day)” which had songs like "Hope", "Ani Yali Amanyi", "Because of you" etc., on this debut solo Album, he worked with the likes of Michael Ouma, Herbert Kinobe, Pragmo, Kaz Kasozi, Winstone Mayanjya, Brian Muganyi, Jude Mugerwa, Estar Nabaasa, to create a blend that's African yet urban and soulful.

In 2021, Benon was appointed to buganda tourism board to spearhead tourism initiatives in Buganda Kingdom.

== Music ==
Benon first made his name under a music duo Benon and Vamposs. The duo started doing music in 2000. The duo had successful songs like "Mumulete", "I know", "Nsazewo", and "My lady". The video for their song "Mumuleete" made it to the top ten on MTV chart in UK. In 2009, Vampino opted for a solo career as Benon concentrated on music production. He has had successful singles like "Ani yali amanyi" originally done by Elly Wamala, "Hope", "Owana lwaki akaaba" and "Singa Kisoboka".

== Discography ==
- Olunaku Olupya (A new day)

=== Benon and Vamposs ===
- Extra, Extra Large, 2007
