= GNL Zamba =

Ugandan musical artist

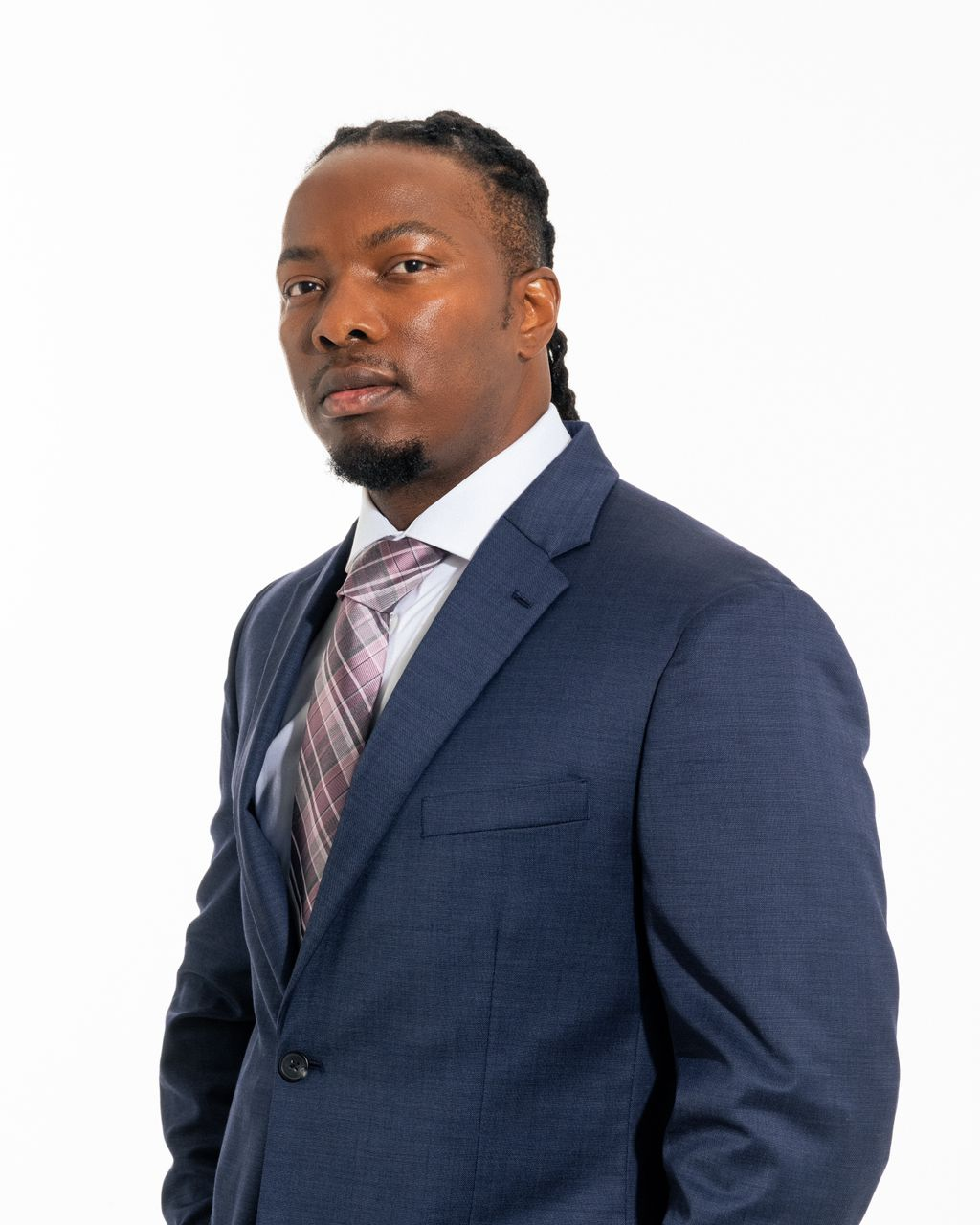
- GNL Zamba in November 2022

Background information
- Born: Ernest Nsimbitulye Lupiiyazitta Zamba; 29 January 1986 (age 40); Uganda
- Genre: Hip hop
- Occupations: Rapper, musician, songwriter, actor
- Instruments: Drums, cymbals
- Years active: 2005–present
- Labels: Baboon Forest Entertainment, nsimbi music
- Website: www.gnlzamba.com

GNL Zamba, born Ernest Nsimbitulye Lupiiyazitta Zamba (29 January 1986), is a Ugandan hip hop artist who is credited with bringing rap and Lugaflow, a style of music to mainstream radio and other media in Uganda.

His stage name, GNL, is short for "Greatness with No Limits". He is the founder and CEO of the independent hip hop record label Baboon Forest Entertainment, which nurtures new talent in Kampala, Uganda. He is also an actor, filmmaker, and ambassador for Ugandan brands and social initiatives.

== Early life and education ==
GNL was born on 29 January 1986 in Mukono. His father was an electrical technician and his mother worked for Uganda Transport Company. The family later moved to Kawempe, in Kampala after the Ugandan Civil War. in his secondary school, he was chairman of junior literature club, member of the debating team and head writer of the Kiira Mirror.

He later joined Makerere University where he graduated with honours with Bachelors in Environmental Management.

== Career ==
=== 2005–2010 ===
In 2005, GNL started his journey in the entertainment industry in Uganda when he was part of the Hip Hop Canvas which was a project organised by Platinum Entertainment's Shadrak Kuteesa, aiming to empower the youth to express themselves. In this project he, together with other artists recorded the award winning song, Mother Africa.

In 2007, he made his debut in the Ugandan musical scene with the song, Soda Jinjale, which is a play on the drink, Soda & Ginger Ale. The song propelled GNL from an underground emcee to a renowned Hip Hop artist bringing a new sound to the genre, that he called Lugaflow (Luganda Flow).

In February 2009, he performed at the WAPI British Council Initiative and later that month at the Sauti Za Busara in Zanzibar. In April, he performed at the Selam International Music Festival in Ethiopia. In June, GNL performed at the Kwita Izina Gorilla Naming Ceremony in Rwanda and in August, he performed his first concert with the release of his album, Koyi Koyi, comprising eight number one singles which was praised for bridging the gap between traditional and contemporary sound. In September, GNL performed at the Dubai Concerts in the United Arab Emirates and in October, he performed at the Stratford Rex, East London in the United Kingdom.

In September 2010, he performed at the 'We Love Africa Music Festival' in Denmark.

=== 2011–2020 ===
In November 2011, GNL returned to United Arab Emirates for the Dubai Concerts and also performed at the 23rd Ugandan North American Association (UNAA) convention.

In September 2012, he performed at the Selam African Music Festival in Sweden and at GNL Zamba Live in Norway.

In April 2014, GNL had VIP concerts in Durban, Port Elizabeth and Cape Town in South Africa.

GNL then relocated to United States

In April 2016, GNL got his first acting career role alongside Darren Lee Campbell

GNL became one of the radio hosts of Coke Studio Radio Hour, which was a program that was part of Coke Studio Africa in August 2017.

In June 2019, his works were nominated at the 17th Independent Music Awards in New York City. These were Best Debut Album (Nsimbi), Best World Beat Song (Leo Ni Leo), Best Narrative Music Video (Dunia Ni Matenbezi) and Best Spoken Word (Acholi Boy). Leo Ni Leo won the Best World Beat song.

In February 2020, he held a lecture in the history of Hip Hop to the music students of Kyambogo University. In July of the same year, GNL, through his record label, Baboon Forest Entertainment, created the "Dear Hip Hop" challenge whose objective was to empower youth through the arts. The eventual winner was Ivan Kaweesa.

=== 2021–present ===
In February 2021, GNL returned to Uganda from the USA and in December, he performed in the third edition of the online Tusker Malt Conversessions.

== Music style ==
GNL provides his lyrics in both Luganda and English. He sings in urban Ugandan hip hop style called Lugaflow. Lugaflow is rap in Luganda, the indigenous language in Uganda's Central Region. Since the late 2000s, Lugaflow has inspired a new generation of Ugandan rappers to create popular music in their native language.

His musical style was influenced by poets Gil Scott-Heron and Mbuli, Afrocentric musical artists like Eddy Grant and Fela Kuti and hiphop stars like Jay-Z, Nas and Ice Cube.

== Social campaigns ==
GNL participated in Friend A Gorilla, an Oxfam-sponsored campaign about environmental education with the Uganda Wildlife Authority. His song "Story ya Luka" was selected by the Uganda Ministry of Health to headline a 2010 AIDS youth education campaign.

His video collaboration for "True Manhood" with Young Empowered And Healthy (YEAH) Uganda encouraged Ugandan youth to use condoms, and it won the People's Choice Digital Media Award at the 2011 International Entertainment Education Conference.

Over a three-year period, GNL worked with Buzz Teenies to tour Ugandan schools, offering youth mentorship, encouraging social unity and staying in school.

Since 2013, GNL has partnered with Reach A Hand Foundation Uganda to participate in a series of youth edutainment campaigns.

In 2014, the Twaweza Initiative awarded GNL for the positive social impact of his song "We Cry", which speaks about street violence and safe sex. He has been invited to lecture at Makerere University's College of Humanities on oral literature and ethnology.

In June 2020, GNL together with his wife Miriam Tamar, joined the George Floyd protests in the USA.

== Personal life ==
Through the success of his music career, GNL was able to open a sports bar and bought land around Uganda.

GNL Zamba wedded his wife, on 29 April 2018 at Cielo Farms Vineyard, Malibu, California. Together with his wife, who is also a musical artist, they formed a musical group called Nsimbi.

In 2020, Zamba and his wife decided to return to Uganda to settle. he has a new born baby

== Awards and nominations ==
Award/organization	Year	Nominee/work	Category	Result	Ref.
Pearl of Africa Music Awards	2005		Best Hip Hop Single	Won	
Uganda Buzz Music Awards	2009	GNL Zamba	Best Male Artist	Nominated	
Pearl of Africa Music Awards	2009		Best Single	Nominated	
Press Association Awards	2009	GNL Zamba	Artist of the year	Won	
Pearl of Africa Music Awards	2009		Best Hip hop single	Won	
Kisima Awards, Kenya	2010	GNL Zamba	Best Hip Hop Artist	Nominated	
Kisima Awards, Kenya	2010		Best single	Nominated	
Uganda Buzz Music Awards	2010		Song of the year	Nominated	
Pearl of Africa Music Awards	2010		Best single	Nominated	
Pearl of Africa Music Awards	2010		Best Group	Nominated	
Uganda Buzz Music Awards	2010	GNL Zamba	Best male artist	Nominated	
Uganda Buzz Music Awards	2010	GNL Zamba	Artist of the year	Nominated	
Uganda Buzz Music Awards	2010	GNL Zamba	Best hood rapper	Won	
Pearl of Africa Music Awards	2010		Best Hip Hop single	Won	
Uganda Buzz Music Awards	2011	GNL Zamba	Artist of the year	Nominated	
Pearl of Africa Music Awards	2011	GNL Zamba	Best male artist	Nominated	
Pearl of Africa Music Awards	2011		Best single	Nominated	
Pearl of Africa Music Awards	2011		Best Hip Hop single	Won	
International Education Conference	2011	GNL Zamba	People's choice digital media	Won	
Uganda Buzz Music Awards	2011	Baboon Forest	Hottest group	Won	
Kandanke Awards	2012	GNL Zamba	Artist of the year	Nominated	
Uganda Buzz Music Awards	2012		Best Hip Hop single	Nominated	
Uganda Buzz Music Awards	2012	GNL Zamba	Best male artist	Won	
Kandanke Awards	2013		Best Hip Hop single	Nominated	
Kandanke Awards	2013	GNL Zamba	Best male artist	Nominated	
Kandanke Awards	2013	GNL Zamba	Artist of the year	Nominated	
Kadanke Awards	2013		Best Hip Hop single	Won	
Kadanke Awards	2013		Best group	Won	
Club Music Video Awards	2013		Best male video of the year	Won	
Club Music Video Awards	2013		Video of the year	Won	
Uganda Buzz Music Awards	2013		Best group	Won	
Rising Star Awards	2014	GNL Zamba	Best Hip Hop artist	Nominated	
Hipipo Awards	2014	GNL Zamba	Best Hip Hop artist	Nominated	
Zina Awards	2014		Best Hip Hop single	Nominated	
Twaweza	2014	GNL Zmba	Best Social Impact Through The Arts Award	Won	
256 Hip-Hop Awards	2019		African rapper of the year	Won	
Independent Music Awards	2019	Nsimbi	Best Debut Album	Nominated	
Independent Music Awards	2019	Leo Ni Leo	Best World Beat Song	Won	
Independent Music Awards	2019	Dunia Ni Matembezi	Best Narrative Music Video	Nominated	
Independent Music Awards	2019	Acholi Boy	Best Spoken Word	Nominated	

== Discography ==
- Koyi Koyi (Riddles of Life), 2009
- Speaking Vernacular, 2011
- The Renaissance / Uganda Yaffe, 2013
- I Am Zamba / Ceazar, 2014
- Dreaming in Colour (in production 2016)
- The Spear (2020)
