= John Blaq =

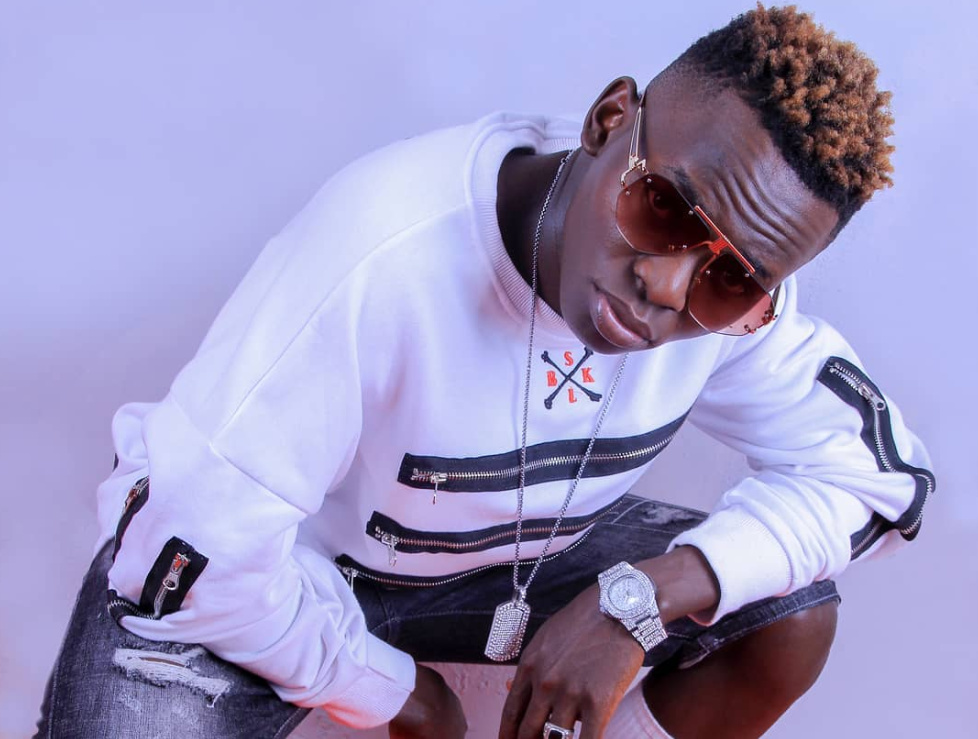
- John Blaq in the Studio

Background information
- Born: Kasadha John; 16 July 1996 (age 29); Jinja
- Origin: Jinja, Uganda
- Genres: Rapper, hip hop, electronic
- Occupations: Musician, songwriter
- Instrument: Vocals
- Years active: 2018–present
- Label: John Blaq Music

John Blaq (born Kasadha John on 16 July 1996) is a Ugandan musician, songwriter & performing artist .

He is commonly known for his bass vocals and dancehall music accompanied with the introduction [Aya Basi) in all his songs.

== Early life and education ==
John Blaq attended Lwanda Primary School and Hasan Tourabi Primary School for Primary Leaving Examination. In 2012, he joined Bweyogerere Secondary School, where he attained both a UCE and a UACE certificate in 2016 and 2018, respectively.

== Music career ==
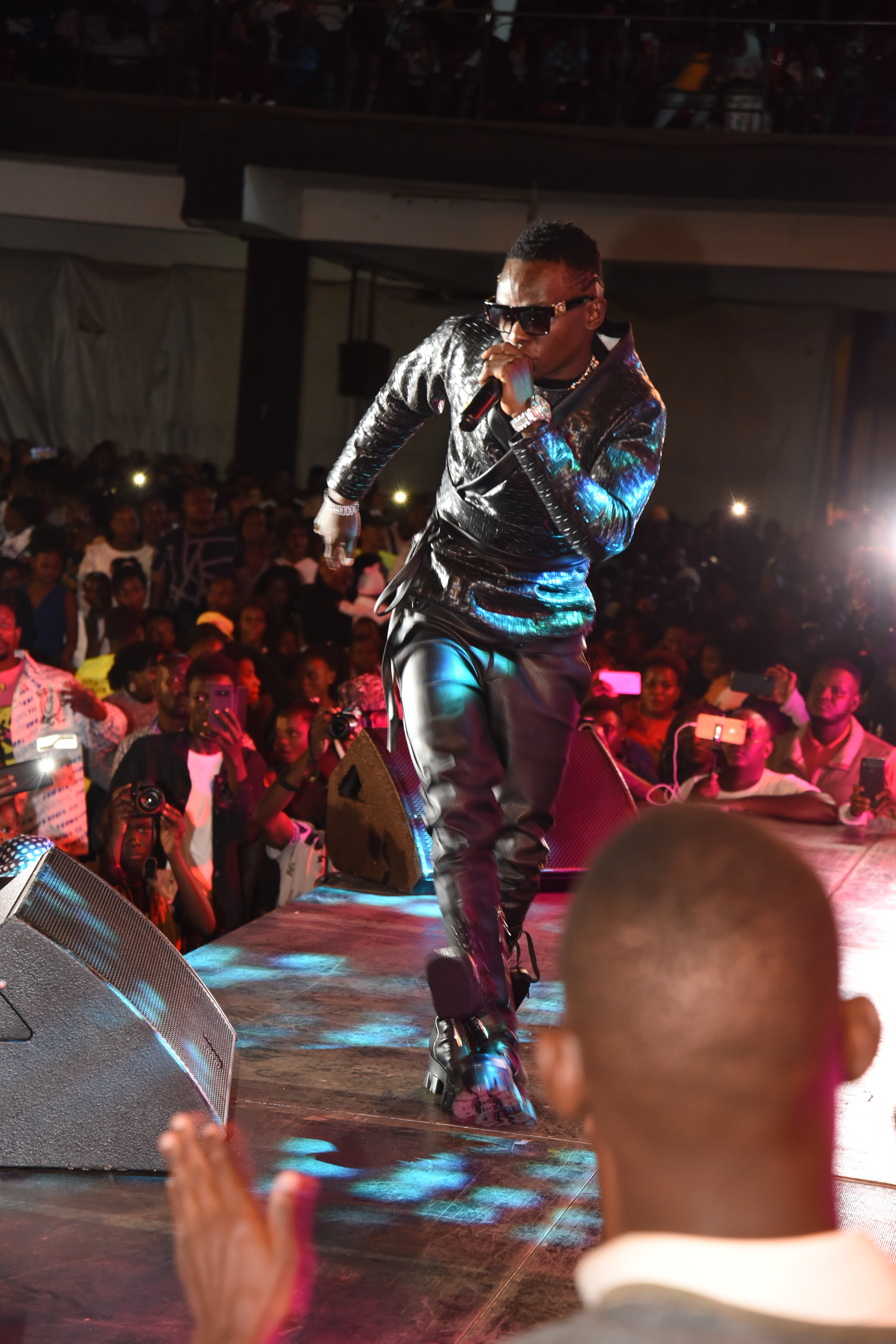
John Blaq.jpg

John Blaq broke through in 2018 with his single, "Tukwatagane". The song "Sweet Love" was his first collaboration with Vinka, and was released in December, 2018. His first concert took place in Freedom City, Kampala on 29 November 2019 and was named Aya Basi Concert after his common phrase [aya basi].

== Discography ==
- Romantic 2018
- Sweet Love ft. Vinka 2018
- Tukwatagane 2018
- Program Ft. VIP Jemo & Green Daddy 2018
- Kyoyoya Ft. Daddy Andre & Prince Omar 2018
- Obubadi 2018
- Makanika 2019
- Maama Bulamu 2019
- Do Dat 2019
- Tewelumya Mutwe 2019
- Ebyalagirwa 2019
- Replace me Ft. Sheebah Karungi & Grenade Official 2019
- Ebintu byo Ft. Ykee Benda 2019
- Tewelumya Mutwe Ft. DJ Shiru & Jowylanda 2019
- "Singa osobola" ft Lydia Jazmine 2023
- "Just bu just" 2023
- Nekwataako 2020
- Oli Wamanyi Ft. Slim Prince 2020
- Hullo 2020
- Blessed Ft. Levixone 2020
- Mu Lubiri 2020

== Endorsements ==
In September 2019, Kasadha signed with Pepsi under their promotion of the "Tukonectinge Pepsi" campaign. In 2019, he participated in a campaign for fighting teenage pregnancy.

== Honors ==
Year	Award	Category	Nominee(s)	Result	Ref.
2019	HiPipo Music Awards	Must Watch Talent Artist	John Blaq	Won	
2019	Zzina Awards	Best DanceHall song "Tukwatagane”	John Blaq	Won	
2019	Zzina Awards	Best DanceHall Artist	John Blaq	Won	
2019	Zzina Awards	Break Through Artist	John Blaq	Won	
2019	Zzina Awards	Best Male artist	John Blaq	Nominated	
2019	Zzina Awards	Artist of the Year	John Blaq	Nominated	
2019	Buzz Teeniez Awards	Teeniez Artist of the Year	John Blaq	Won	
2019	Buzz Teeniez Awards	Teeniez Breakout Artist of the Year	John Blaq	Won	
2019	Buzz Teeniez Awards	Teeniez Male Artist of the Year	John Blaq	Won	
2020	HiPipo Music Awards	Best Breakthrough Artist	John Blaq	Won	
2020	HiPipo Music Awards	Song of the Year	Do Dat	Won	
2021	MTV Africa Music Awards	Best Breakthrough Act	John Blaq	Pending	

== See also ==
- Giovanni Kiyingi
- Geoffrey Oryema
- Gravity Omutujju
