= Buzz Teeniez Awards =

Ugandan media award

- Awarded for: Achievements in music, television, radio, sports, film, and more, as voted by teenagers
- Location: Kampala
- Country: Uganda
- Presented by: Buzz Magazine
- First award: 2007

Buzz Teeniez Awards is an annual award ceremony in Kampala, Uganda that was started in 2007 by a magazine called Buzz. The Buzz Teeniez Awards are catered to teen viewers to honor the biggest achievers in television, music, gospel, Dee Jays, movies, Sports, Radio and more.

== Award categories ==
The Teeniez Buzz Awards categories include: television, music, gospel, Dee Jays, movies, Sports, Radio and more.

=== Music ===
- Teeniez male artist
- Teeniez female artist
- Teeniez best comedian
- Teeniez Hottest group/duo
- Teeniez Best Album
- Teeniez hottest Riddim
- Teeniez Hood Rapper
- Teeniez R&B Artist/Group
- Teeniez Dancehall/Group
- Teeniez Fresh/Breakout Artist

=== Gospel ===
- Teeniez Artist
- Teeniez Song

=== Dee Jays ===
- Teeniez Wickedest D.J.
- Teeniez Beat Maker

=== Radio Industry ===
- Teeniez Hottest Radio Personality
- Teeniez Funkiest Radio Station

=== TV Industry ===
- Teeniez TV Personality
- Teeniez TV Drama/Soap/Local Show
- Teeniez TV Station

=== Achievement Award ===
- Teeniez Role Model
- Teeniez Outstanding School
- Teenie of the Year

=== Special Award ===
- Extra Ordinary Achievement Award

=== Business World ===
- Teeniez Best New Business/Campaign/Product
- Business with the Dopest Customer Service

== Controversy ==
The Buzz Teeniez Awards have been criticized for describing a category as "riddim" and then failing to follow the meaning of "riddim" when picking past winners, and for including NTV and Hot 100, the award sponsors, as nominees.
