= Haka Mukiga =

Ugandan musician

- Birth name: Arinaitwe Birihona
- Born: Kabale District, Uganda
- Genres: World music; Folk music
- Occupation(s): Musician, singer
- Instrument(s): Guitar, Tube fiddle (Endigidi), Adungu (Enanga), Flute (Omukuri)
- Years active: 2013–present

Arinaitwe Rurihona, professionally known as Haka Mukiga is a Ugandan world and folk singer-songwriter, multi-instrumentalist, poet and dancer. He sings in a number of local languages including Rukiga, Acholi, Rukonjo, and Rufumbira.

== Education ==
Mukiga attended Vincent Alex Primary School in Mukono, Naalya SS, and Kisubi High School for his secondary school before enrolling at Makerere University in 2012 for a Bachelor of Arts degree, majoring in Tourism.

Although Rukiga is his mother tongue, Mukiga he composes music in various traditional instrumentations and languages, such as Acholi, Rukonjo and Rufumbira.

== Music career ==
He is a multi-instrumentalist who plays instruments like enanga, Omukuri, Enzamba, Guitar and various other guitars. He started his professional music carrier in 2015 playing at festivals, scoring films, and many other events like, Pearl Rhythm stage coach and festival. He also performed at the Milege World Music Festival in both 2014 and 2015, the Nyege Nyege Festival, Yella Cultural festival, Ongala festival in Tanzania and the Laba Festival.

On 13 April 2019, Mukiga played at the official Ugandan launch for the janzi, held by Ssewa Ssewa at Katonga Hall in Kampala.

== Songs ==
- Enzamba Egambe
- Nyesiga
- Kangyerengyere
- Kazooba
- Omuti Murungi
- Otudu Wiye (Acholi love ballad)

== Awards and nominations ==
Awards & Nominations
Year	Award	Category	Result	Ref
2017	The Uganda Music Awards (TAMU)	Best Regional Artiste (Western); Song:Enzamba Egambe	Nominated	

== See also ==
- List of Ugandan musicians
- Undercover Brothers Ug
- Giovanni Kiyingi
- Suzan Kerunen
- Milege
- Sandy Soul
