= Janzi Band =

Ugandan music group

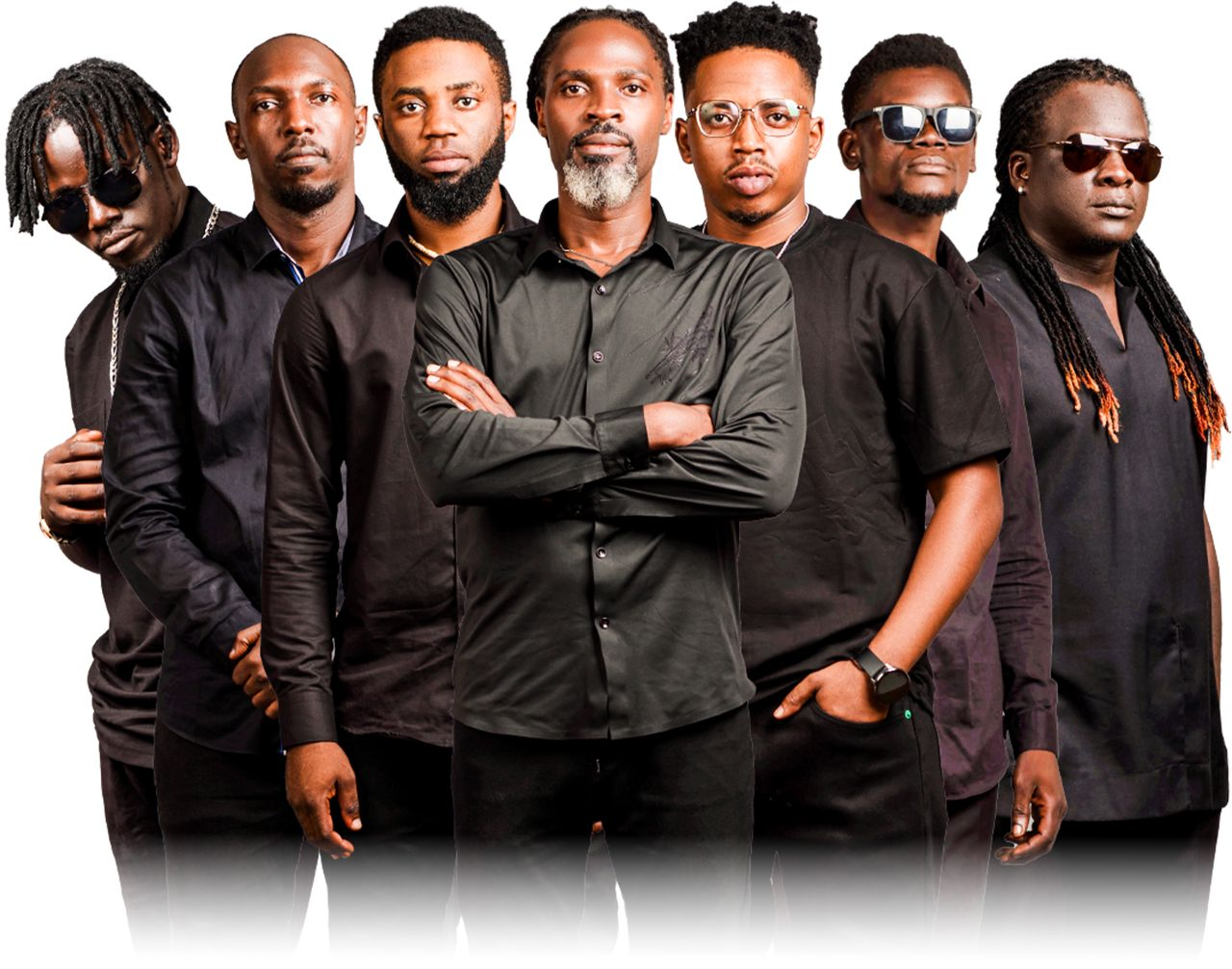

Background information
- Origin: Kampala, Uganda
- Genres: Afro-Fusion; World Music; Jazz
- Instrument(s): Janzi, Akogo, Adungu, Endongo, Endigidi, Amadinda, Engoma, Mbira and percussions
- Years active: 2009–present
- Labels: Janzi Music
- Members: Ssewa Ssewa - (Janzi Instrument): Hakim Kiwanuka - (Percussions); Emma Kitiibwa - (Keyboards); Desire Logo - (Bass Guitar); Serge Bahati - (Drums); Bonah Kikuru - (Guitar); Michael Noel - (Saxophone); Muchunguzi Alloysius a.k.a Zenji Blackman - (Vocalist)
- Past members: Nkubehinda Israel - (Guitar); Jimmy Lubwama a.k.a (Pages) - Vocalist; Abraham Ssembatya (Base Guitar); Augustine Mukisa (Drums); Mitchy Dalen (Vocalist); Abraham Ssekasi - (Percussions); Claudia Namazzi - (Vocalist); Brenda Birungi - (Vocalist); Michael Ssebulime - Guitarist; Trevor Muhumuza - Keyboardist; Kevin Sekasi - Drums; Allan Okia - Base Guitarist; Joewi - (Keyboards); Emma Emong - (Drums); Joseph Kizito - Saxophone; Jemimah Sanyu - Vocalist; Jackie Akello - Vocalist; Jacinta; Brian Gideon - (vocalist); Jackson Kirya - (Saxophone); Rose Nabiryo - (Vocalist); Steven Oundo - (Vocalist and guitarist); Joshua Maggwa - (Drummer); Hazel Granger - (Saxophone); Buko Bright - (Guitar); Claudia Namazzi - (Vocalist); Brenda Birungi - (Vocalist); Steven Kigozi - (Keyboard)

Janzi, is a Ugandan afrobeat, fusion, contemporary and world music band formed on 27 August 2009 by Ssewa Ssewa. The band has a hybrid repertoire of music, including notable covers as well as an original ethno-pop discography. The band has worked alongside a number of Ugandan musicians.

They are known for the creation of a new Ugandan harp-like instrument, the Janzi.

Their first album, Eka (Home) was released in on i-Tunes in 2017.

== Background ==
Janzi is a Luganda word which originates from Ejjanzi, a name for grasshopper which according to the founder Ssewa Ssewa, means that Janzi Band flies like grasshoppers. In 2009, Ssewa Ssewa developed an idea to start a project that could aid cultural development through music. The ambition was to unite cultures of different regions from Uganda with the rest of the world through music collaborations, workshops and live performances of different ethnic origins.

== Career ==
Since its inception in 2009, Janzi Band has steadily grown and has performed at different gigs in Uganda such as Zone 7 in Bugolobi, Club Amnesia, Big Mikes at Acacia Avenue and several casual and corporate functions. They have also performed at the annual Blankets and Wine festival, Milege World Music Festival in 2013 and 2015, Pearl Rhythm Festival, Bayimba Festival and others.

In 2016, they headlined the Tokosa Food Festival with Ugandan musician Lilian Mbabazi, and in the same year collaborated with A Pass at the Chronixx Show.

As of April 2019, their music is described on their Facebook page as "all-acoustic, all-traditional ensemble" as well as "an electric Afro-beat fusion band for festivals, weddings and concerts". They like the music of Afrigo Band, Morgan Heritage, UB40 and Salif Keita.

== Band members ==
=== Current members ===
As of April 2019 the band has nine members:

- Ssewa Ssewa (founder, African traditional instrumentalist, vocalist, percussionist)
- Hakim Kiwanuka - (Percussions)
- Emma Kitiibwa - (Keyboards)
- Desire Logo - (Bass Guitar)
- Serge Bahati - (Drums)
- Bonah Kikuru - (Guitar)
- Michael Noel - (Saxophone)
- Muchunguzi Alloysius a.k.a Zenji Blackman - (Vocalist)

== Discography ==
Eka

Studio album by Janzi Band
- Released: May 7, 2017
- Genre: World, Afrobeat, Fusion
- Length: 37:21
- Label: Janzi Music
- Producer: Various: Janzi Band

Janzi Band chronology
Eka	TBA

Alternative cover

Singles from Eka
- 1. "Afrika"

=== Albums ===
==== Eka (2017) ====
Eka is Janzi's first studio album and was officially released on iTunes on 7 May 2017. All the songs on the album were co-written and co-produced by the band's members. The songs on the album have however been played live by the band for many years. Eka was released under the band's label, Janzi Music.

Track Listing
No.	Title	Writer(s)	Label	Length
1.	"Eka"	Janzi	Janzi Music	3.20
2.	"Afrika"	Janzi	Janzi Music	3:16
3.	"Just a Dream"	Janzi	Janzi Music	3:55
4.	"Ngaali"	Janzi	Janzi Music	4.19
5.	"Njabala"	Janzi	Janzi Music	5.30
6.	"Omwana Wabantu"	Janzi	Janzi Music	4.29
7.	"River Road"	Janzi	Janzi Music	4.22
8.	"Zimbabwe"	Janzi	Janzi Music	4.56
9.	"Ekili"	Janzi	Janzi Music	4.24

== See also ==
- List of Ugandan musicians
