= Nsikatila =

Single by Undercover Brothers Ug

from the album At Dawn
- A-side: "Like a Diamond"
- Released: August 20, 2014
- Recorded: July 19, 2014; Jude Mugerwa, (Uganda)
- Genre: World music; pop
- Length: 4:10
- Label: Little Penny Studios
- Songwriters: Timothy Kirya; Jay K Mulungi
- Producer: Jude Mugerwa

Undercover Brothers Ug singles chronology
| "Like a Diamond" (2014) | "Nsikatila" (2014) | "Balikoowa" (2017) |

Music video
- "Nsikatila" on YouTube

Nsikatila, sometimes spelt Nsikatira, is a world-pop love song by Ugandan music duo Undercover Brothers Ug. It was released as the second single from their first EP album and first major release, At Dawn in December (2014) and re-released in January as the first single from their 2016 album, Hitlist. Co-written by the duo's Timothy Kirya and Jay K Mulungi and produced by Jude Mugerwa, the lyrics portray a lover who stammers (like a scratched CD) whenever he talks to his lover.
Nsikatila was in December 2016 nominated for Best R&B Song at the HiPipo Music Awards (HMA) 2017.

== Background ==
Nsikatila was co-written by the duo Jay K Mulungi and Timothy Kirya and produced by Jude Mugerwa in 2014. The song was released as the third single under the duo's first album, At Dawn in 2014 but stayed unknown to the mainstream market until it was released again as the first single from their second album, Hitlist, 2016, when it received favourable airplay.

== Composition ==
The song begins with the main melody played by Jay K Mulungi on an acoustic guitar. Timothy Kirya sings the first verse and all the choruses while Jay K. Mulungi sings the second verse, starts the bridge and provides backup vocals in the choruses. The song features traditional African instruments, the thumb piano and the Djembe drum, giving it a world pop feel. The lyrics of the song were written in both Luganda and English.

== Reception ==
The song was given a positive welcome to fm radio and social media in Uganda. Nsikatila played on major radio stations in Uganda attracting the duo for interviews on the rest of the radio stations across the country. Jackie Lumbasi of 91.3 Capital FM gave the song a thumbs up when it played on the station. Douglas D. Sebamala of Daily Monitor called the song a nostalgic tune that leaves one craving for the presence of the loved one and questioning whether they too feel the way. Bigeye Entertainment website called Nsikatila a good song with soft texture and great voices suitable for romantic moments.

== Awards ==
Awards
| Year | Award | Category | Result |
|---|---|---|---|
| 2016 | HiPipo Music Awards | Best R&B Song | Nominated |

== Live performance ==
Undercover Brothers Ug performed Nsikatila at the Milege World Music Festival both in 2014 and 2015. The song was also performed at their concert and At Dawn album launch, Unveiling Undercover Brothers Ug in 2014. It was also performed at Pearl Rhythm Festival, Milege World Music Festival, KCCA Festival, Nyege Nyege Festival, Milege Acoustic Project and many other festivals, TV Stations and Radio stations during interviews. The live version of the song sometimes lacks the sound of the thumb piano or (sometimes replaced with the Adungu), and is normally extended from the faded end to climax end.

== Track listing and formats ==
- Digital download
1. "Nsikatila" – 4:24
2. "Like a Diamond" – 3:45
- At Dawn Album
1. "Nsikatila" – 4:24
2. "Like a Diamond" – 3:45
- Hit List Album, 2016
1. "Nsikatila" – 4:22
2. "Ani" – 4:02
- Live Version (Extended)
1. "Nsikatila" – 5:10

== Credits and personnel ==
- Timothy Kirya – vocals, songwriter, Djembe drum
- Jay K Mulungi – vocals, songwriter, Lead guitar, background vocals
- Jude Mugewa – Sound recording and reproduction
- Sam Nalangira – Thumb piano

== See also ==
- Balikoowa
