= Sandra Nankoma =

Ugandan musician (born 1988)

- Born: 27 November 1988 (age 37); Mukono District, Uganda
- Occupations: Singer/Songwriter, actress
- Spouse: Benjamin Lepez
- Parent(s): Samuel Wamubirigwe, Mary Nankinga
- Musical career
- Genres: Jazz; Afro-Soul; jazz-funk; Alternative; world; gospel
- Years active: 2013–present
- Labels: independent.
- Website: www.nankomasandra.com

Sandra Nankoma, previously known as Sandy Soul, is a Ugandan recording artist, singer-songwriter, composer, actor and performer of Afro-soul and jazz music . She is well known for her single Kaddugala from her debut album Ye'nze for which she won an award for Best Female Artist in African Inspirational Music at AFRIMA Awards in 2018 .

== Career ==
Nankoma started performing music professionally in 2013. She performed at the Bayimba Festival of the Arts, following her collaboration with Sylvester Kabombo on hip hop song, "Fumbiro". After her first single, Season she has since recorded a number of other songs, including: Kaddugala, Musaiza Wei'ka, Babylon, and Mercedes (featured on RNW ‘s My Song program on YouTube).

Sandra Nankoma toured Uganda and performed at many festivals including the Bayimba Festival of the Arts Milege World Music Festival organized by Milege, Pearl Rhythm Festival, World Music Day celebrations.

In 2014, Nankoma formed a band, performing as Sandy Soul. As Sandy Soul, Nankoma toured Africa, performing in cities including Nairobi, Arusha, Abidjan, Kigali and making a one-off appearance in Paris. In 2016, she performed at the MASA Arts Festival in Ivory Coast, as a part of Afroman Spice, a Female theatre company she co-founded. Afroman Spice campaign for social change, with a focus on feminism and women's issues. Later that year she performed at Ubumuntu Festival and at the Kigali Up Festival as Sandy Soul.

In 2017 Nankoma took up a music residence in Nairobi called the Soul Train. Here she collaborated with a number of East, West and South African artists including Jojo Abot (Ghana), Blinky Bill (Kenya), Jackie Manyelope, Prisca Ojwang and DJ Kampire. Sandra Nankoma was also an award winner at Visa Pour La Creation, an awards ceremony for African and Caribbean Artists.

In 2018, she released her debut studio album, Ye'nze which was mastered and released in both Uganda and France. Kaddugala (which translates to Melanin), released as an anthem to dark skinned girls and a strong statement against bleaching, was nominated in the 2018 AFRIMAS 'All Africa Music Awards' AFRIMA 2018. Ye'nze also won Nankoma an AFRIMA award for 'Best Female Artist in African Inspirational Music'. Nankoma began touring Ye'nze in 2018.

== Acting career ==
Nankoma has also performed in numerous theatre plays and musicals. She was a founding member of Afroman Spice, a feminist drama group, along with Rashida Namulondo and Linda Nabasa. Together the group performed plays, musicals and poetry about social issues affecting Uganda and Africa at large. Nankoma's band Sandy Soul has performed with the group in Uganda, Kenya and Ivory Coast.

== Personal life and Activism ==
Sandra Nakoma was born and brought up in the Mukono district of central Uganda. Because of her dark skin, she was bullied in school and has since campaigned against racism - including with her song Kaddugala, an anthem for all black women facing racial discrimination. Nankoma is an alumna of Uganda Christian University, Mukono, where she graduated with a bachelor's degree in Industrial Fine Art and Design, with a major in sculpture.

== Discography ==
- Ye'nze 2018

== Awards ==
- Visa Pour La Creation by Institute Francaise France 2017 (Won)
- AFRIMA Award for Best Female Artist in African Inspirational Music 2018 (Won)
- AFRIMA Award for Best Female Artist in Eastern Africa 2018 (Nominated)
