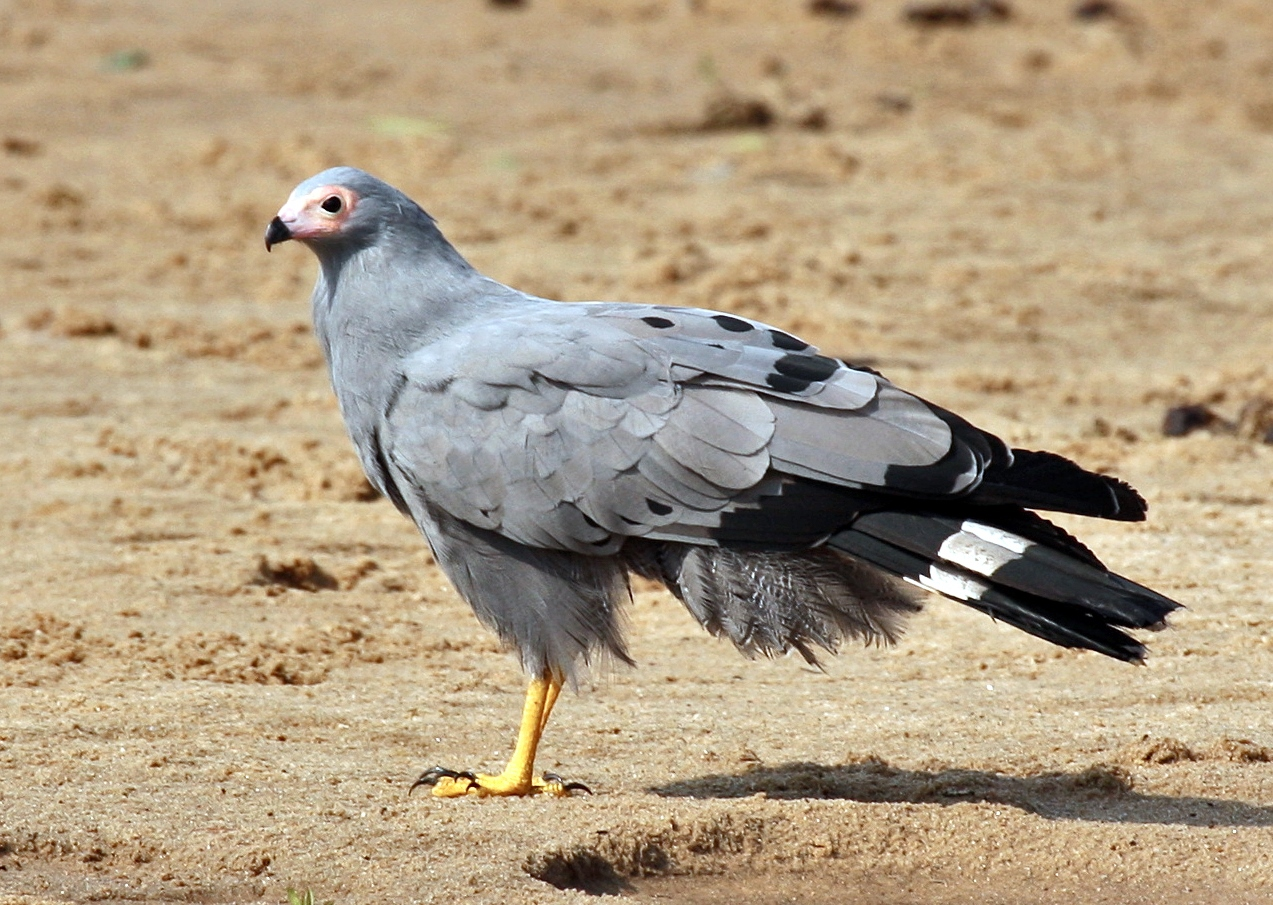

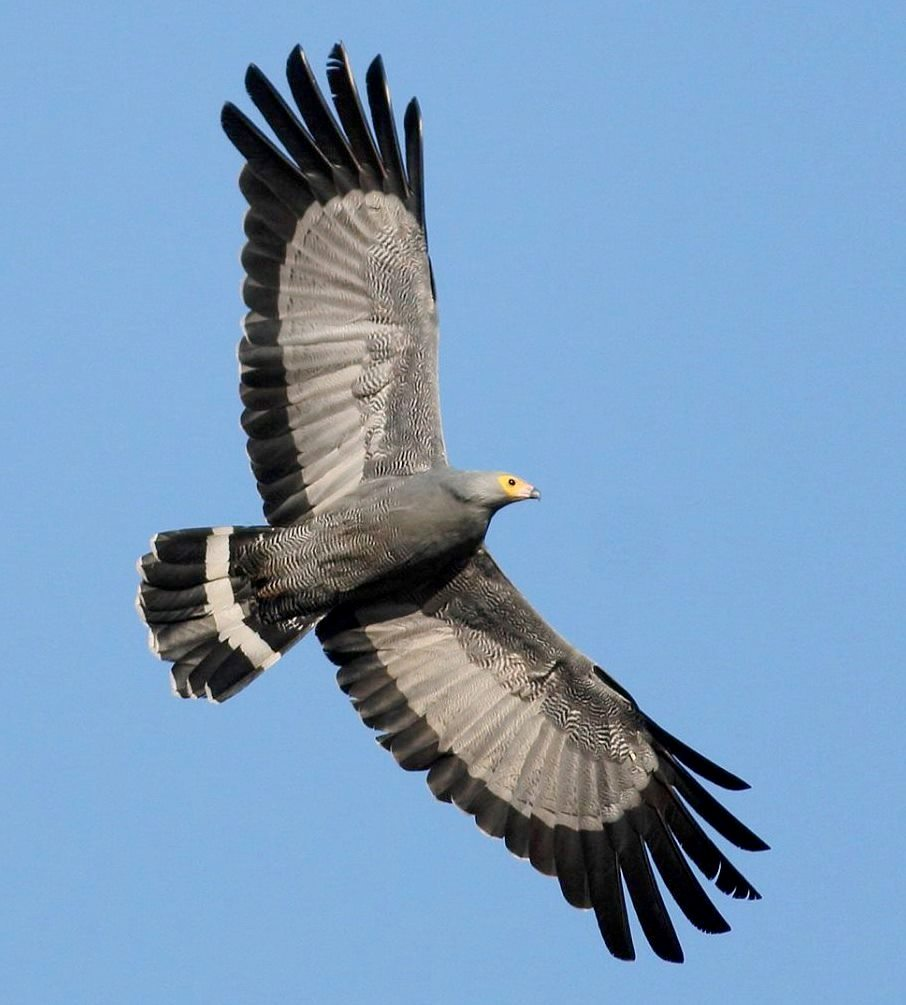
- Adult, settled on sand bank and in flight

Conservation status
- Least Concern (IUCN 3.1)

Scientific classification
- Kingdom: Animalia
- Phylum: Chordata
- Class: Aves
- Order: Accipitriformes
- Family: Accipitridae
- Genus: Polyboroides
- Species: P. typus

Binomial name
- Polyboroides typus Smith, 1829

Subspecies
- P. t. typus - Smith, A, 1829; P. t. pectoralis - Sharpe, 1903

= African harrier-hawk =

Species of bird

The African harrier-hawk, harrier hawk or gymnogene (Polyboroides typus) is a bird of prey. It is about 60–66 centimetres (24–26 in) in length. It breeds in most of Africa south of the Sahara. The only other member of the genus is the allopatric Madagascar harrier-hawk (Polyboroides radiatus).

== Distribution and habitat ==
African harrier-hawks are a common raptorial species south of the Sahara being most commonly found in the tropical regions of western Africa becoming less common in East and South Africa.

African harrier-hawks are adaptable in their habitat preferences, occupying the following habitats in the Dzanga-Sangha Special Reserve in the Central African Republic: thick rainforest, forest edge, riparian areas, agricultural land and human occupied areas. African harrier-hawks are adaptable and able to live in both urban and rural human occupied areas and they are one of the most common raptorial species in traditional rural villages of eastern Guinea-Bissau. African harrier-hawks have also been known to breed in Palm trees present in cities and urban gardens.

== Description ==
The African harrier-hawk is a medium-sized raptor. The upperparts, head and breast are pale grey. The belly is white with fine dark barring. The broad wings are pale grey with a black trailing edge fringed with a narrow white line. The tail is black with a single broad white band. There is a bare facial patch of variable colour, usually red or yellow. Sexes are similar, but young birds have pale brown instead of grey, and dark brown replacing black. An unusual trait of this species is the double-jointed ankles it possesses, which enable it to reach into otherwise inaccessible holes and cracks for prey. A comparable leg-structure and behaviour can be found in the Neotropical crane hawk as well as the extinct Australian Pengana; a case of convergent evolution.

The call is a whistled sueee-sueee-sueee.

== Biology ==
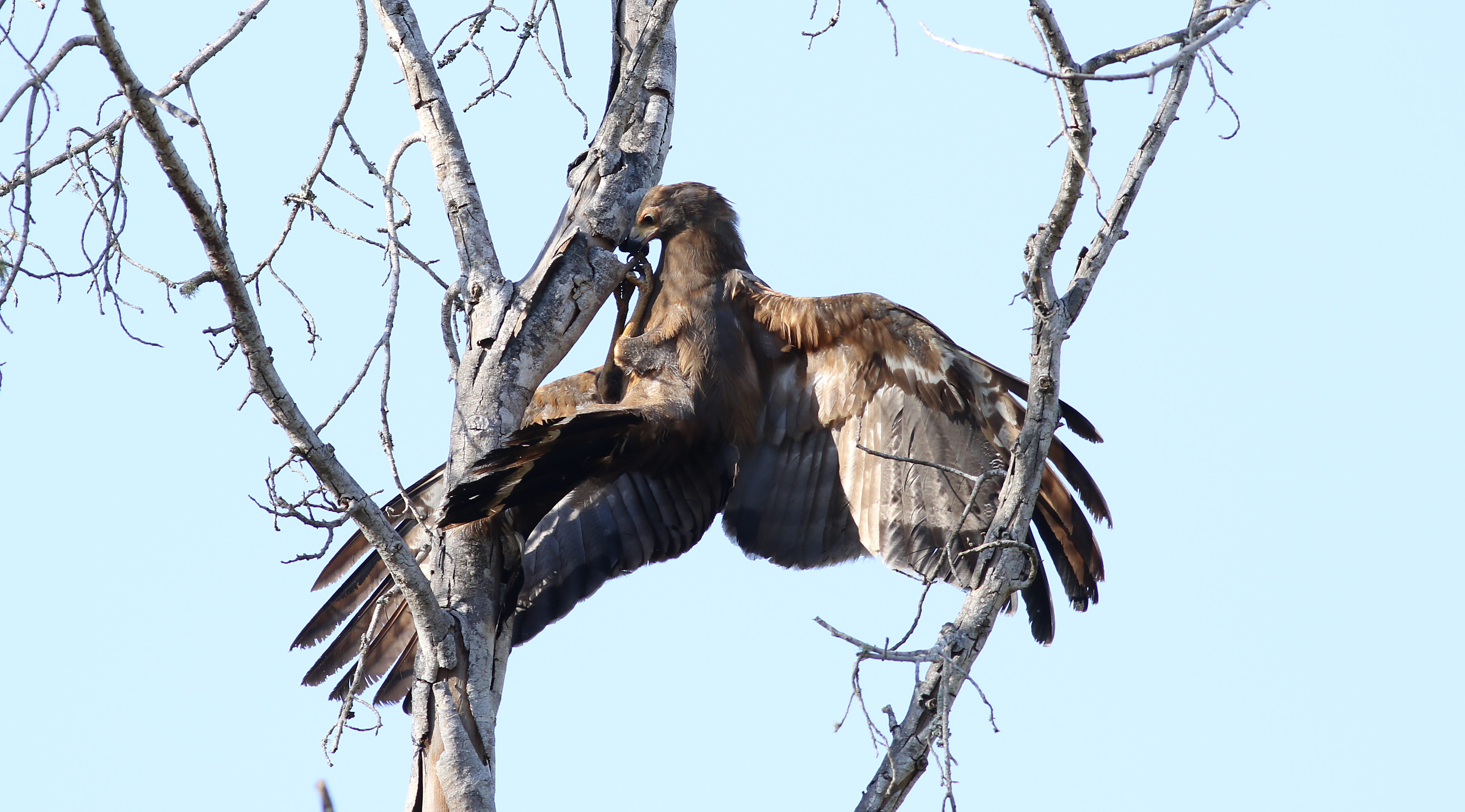
Immature bird lifting tree bark, South Africa

=== Breeding ===
==== Breeding season ====
The breeding season starts at different times in different parts of African harrier-hawk distribution. In Nigeria the breeding season is in March–August and South of the equator it appears that the breeding season is in the austral summer but can vary in the months of different countries in South Africa it is November–December but in Zambia, Malawi and Zimbabwe it is September–November.

==== Nests and nesting ====
Nest sites are most commonly in large trees that are sometimes growing out of or located on a rocky outcrop. Nests are circular and often placed in the main fork of the tree and are below the canopy. Nests can be used for several breeding seasons and are relatively big as are other raptors' reaching estimated sizes of 0.75m wide and 0.2m deep. Nests are made of sticks and are lined with leaves from trees neighbouring the nest. The clutch is one to three eggs.

==== Courtship ====
In the courtship display for African harrier-hawks, either one of or both individuals in a pair soar slowly together, at height, and can often be heard calling during this time. When the male flies on his own he often flies in an undulating pattern and flaps his wings. When the pair fly together, there have been records of the male diving towards the female and touching her back with his talons, and the female turning over and touching talons with the male.

== Foraging ==
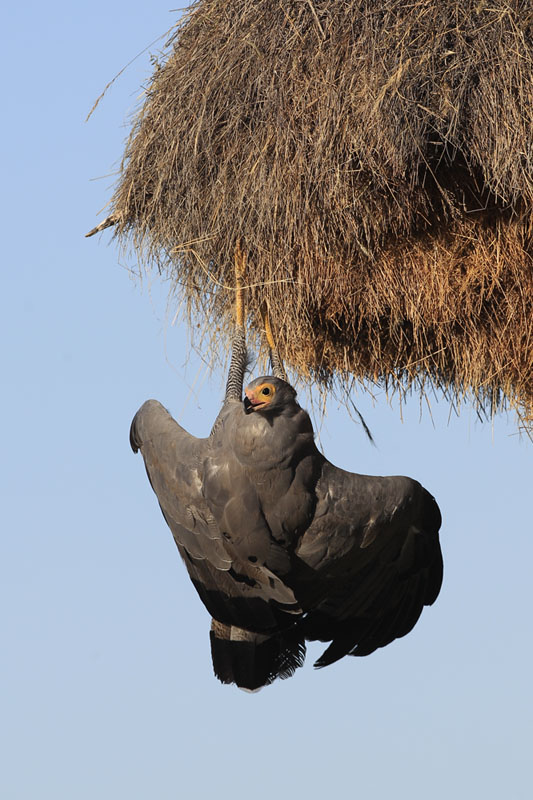
Adult hunting at a weaver colony in Etosha National Park, Namibia

=== Diet ===
The African harrier-hawk is omnivorous, eating the fruit of the oil palm as well as hunting small vertebrates. Its ability to climb, using wings as well as feet, and its long double-jointed legs, enable this bird to raid the nests of cavity-nesters such as barbets and woodhoopoes for eggs and nestlings. It has been known to prey on introduced species such as feral pigeons, house sparrows and eastern gray squirrels.

=== Foraging techniques ===
African harrier-hawks have been identified to employ four different hunting strategies namely: low soaring, high soaring, perch hunting and, canopy and ground foraging. Low soaring is the most commonly used method.The harrier-hawk flies close to the canopy and is often mobbed by small passerine birds. The African harrier-hawk uses the level of aggression shown to help locate nest sites of these passerines and has been observed to turn around when the mobbing by a passerine becomes less aggressive. The harrier-hawk will begin looking for nest sites in the trees once it has found the area where the passerines show the most aggression towards the African harrier-hawk. To catch reptiles in the open African harrier-hawks use high soaring, flying at a maximum of 100m. They descend quickly to a height just above that of the vegetation to where the prey was located. Perch hunting is often used to hunt invertebrates such as orthoptera and other insects. Canopy and ground foraging is where the harrier-hawk either walks on the ground or moves between branches in the canopy looking for prey, looking into crevices and holes in both trees and on the ground.

== Gallery ==
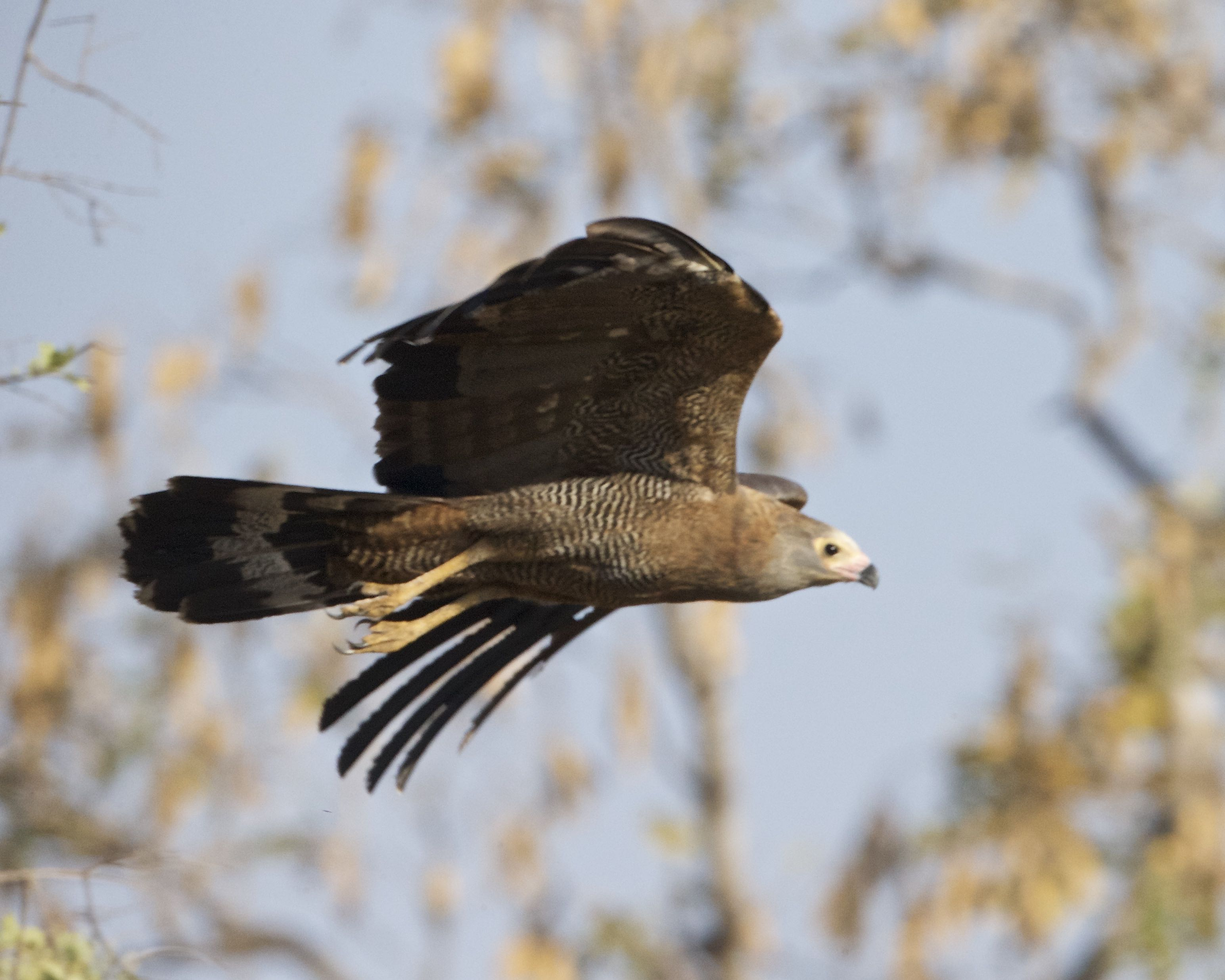
Immature bird in flight, Zambia

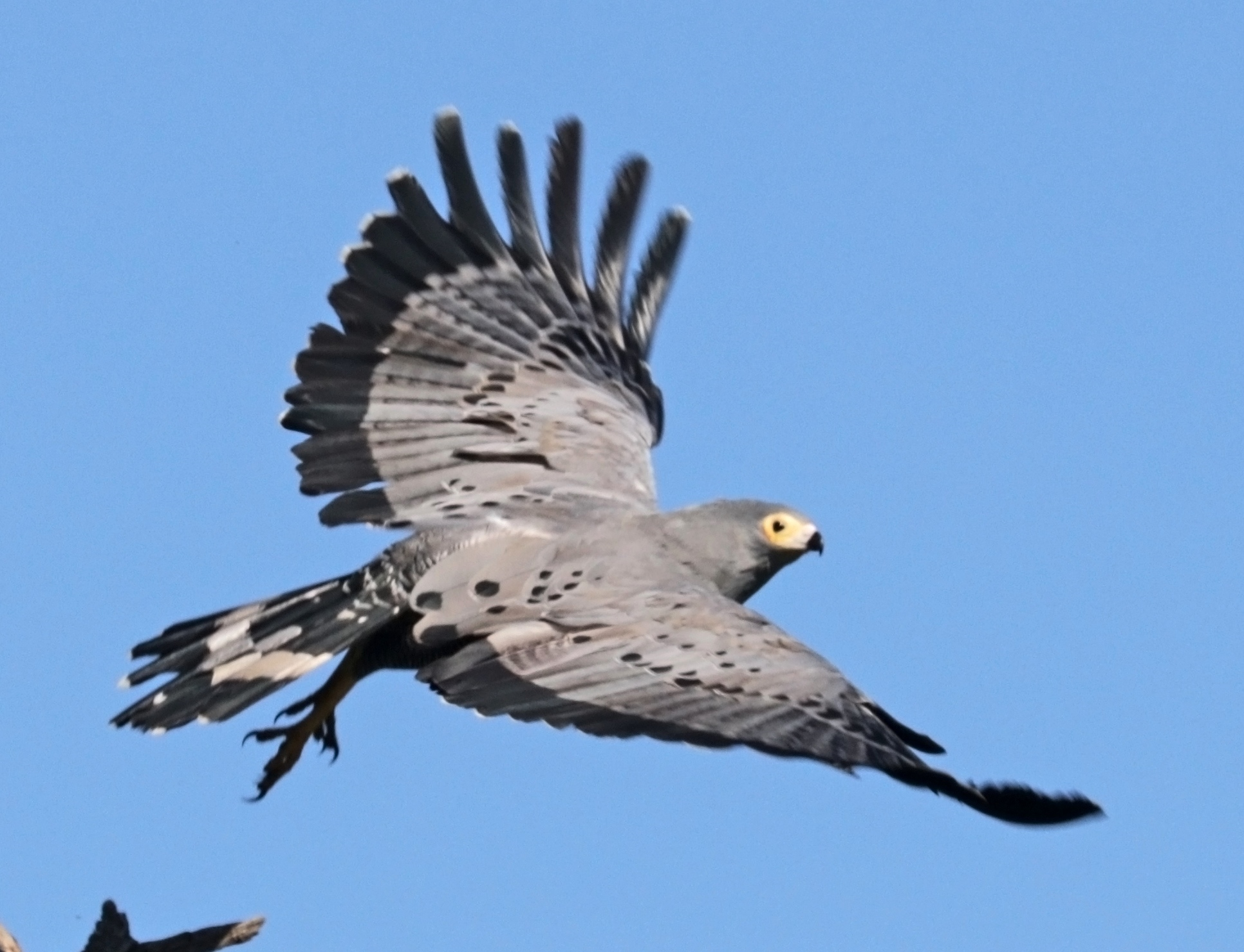
Adult taking flight, Zimbabwe

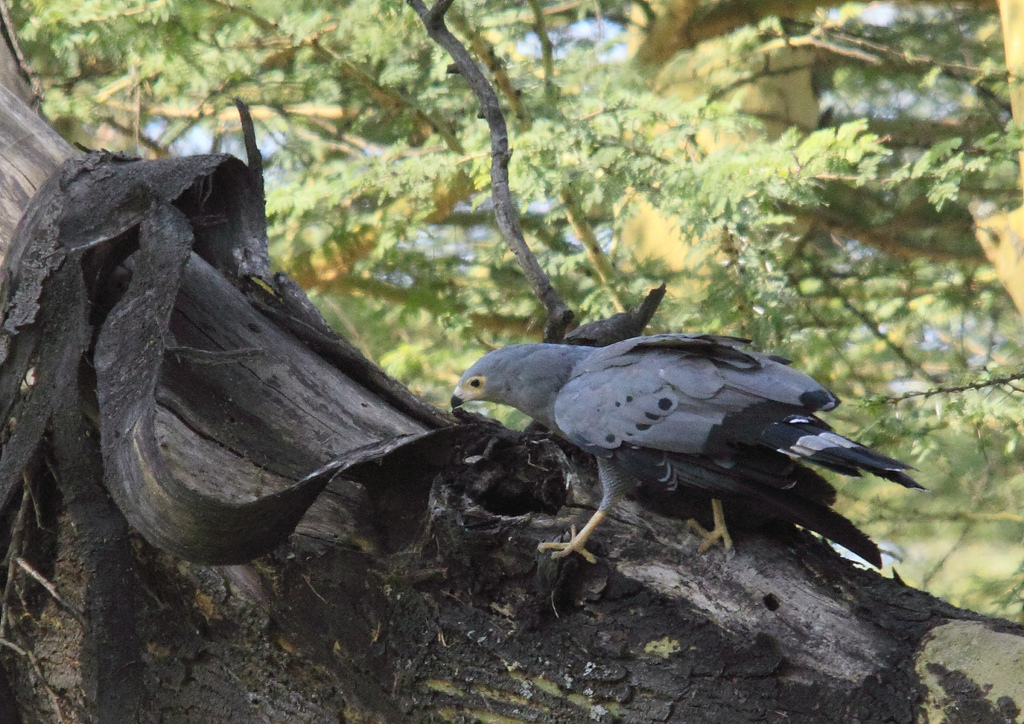
Adult investigating a tree cavity, Kenya

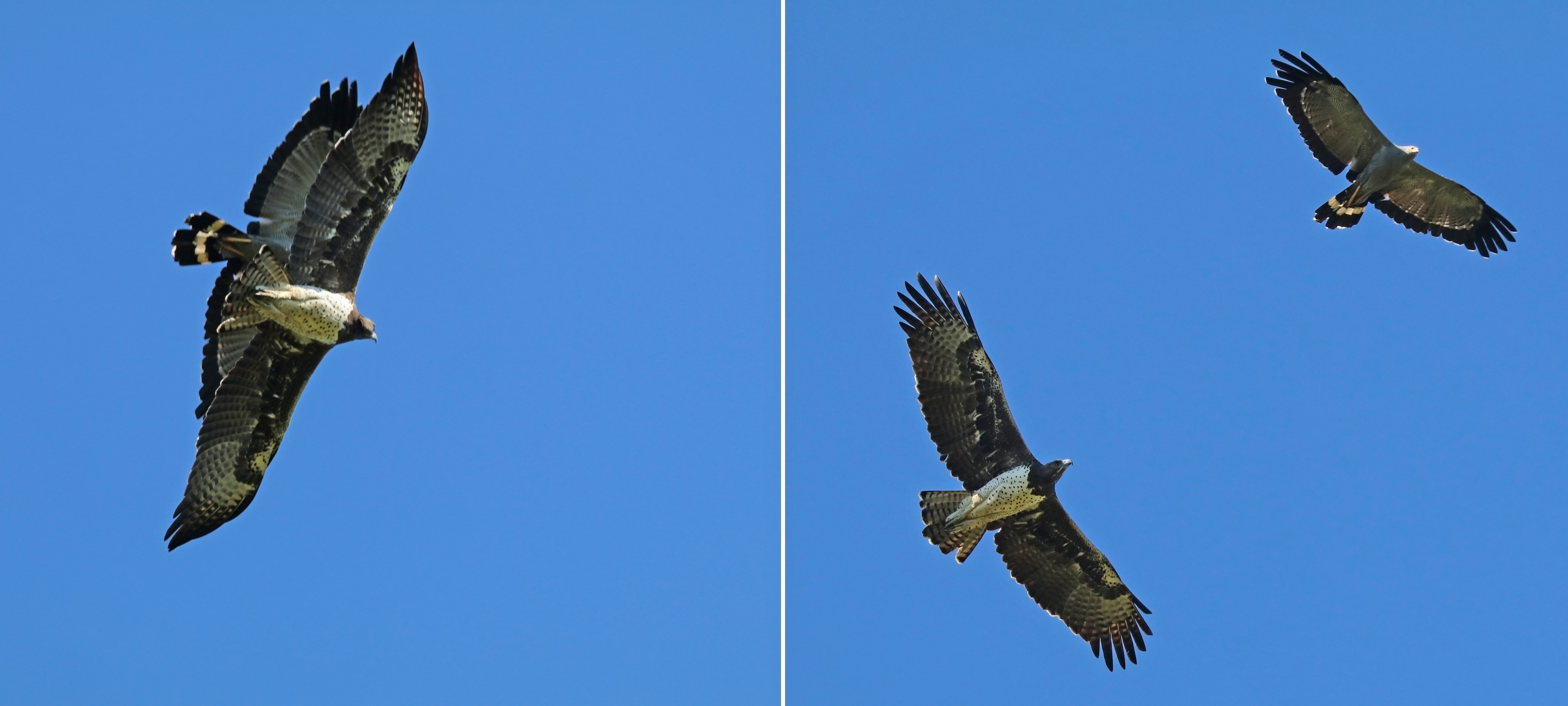
Adult soaring alongside a martial eagle (Polemaetus bellicosus), Zimbabwe

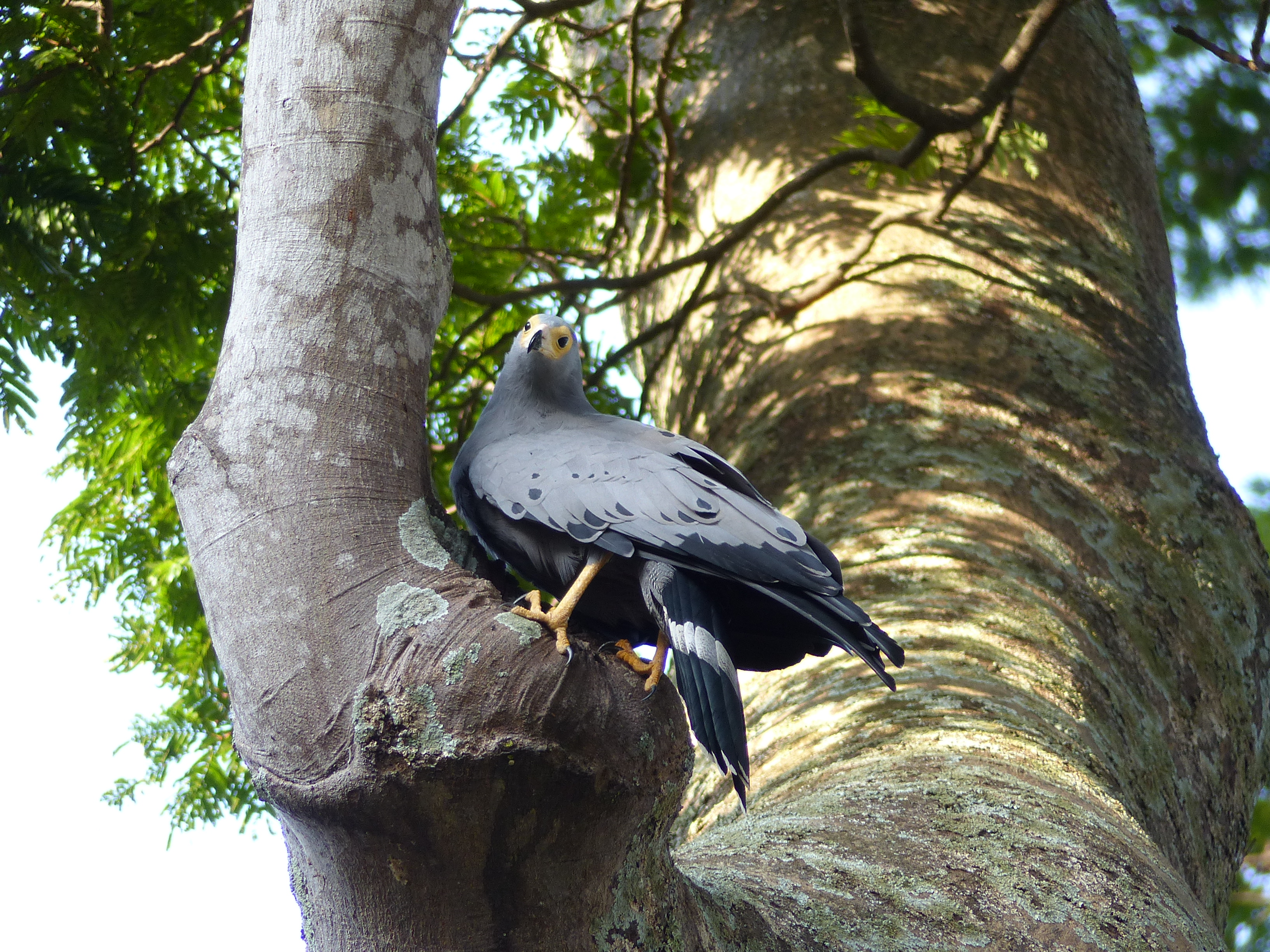
At the Entebbe Botanical Gardens, Uganda

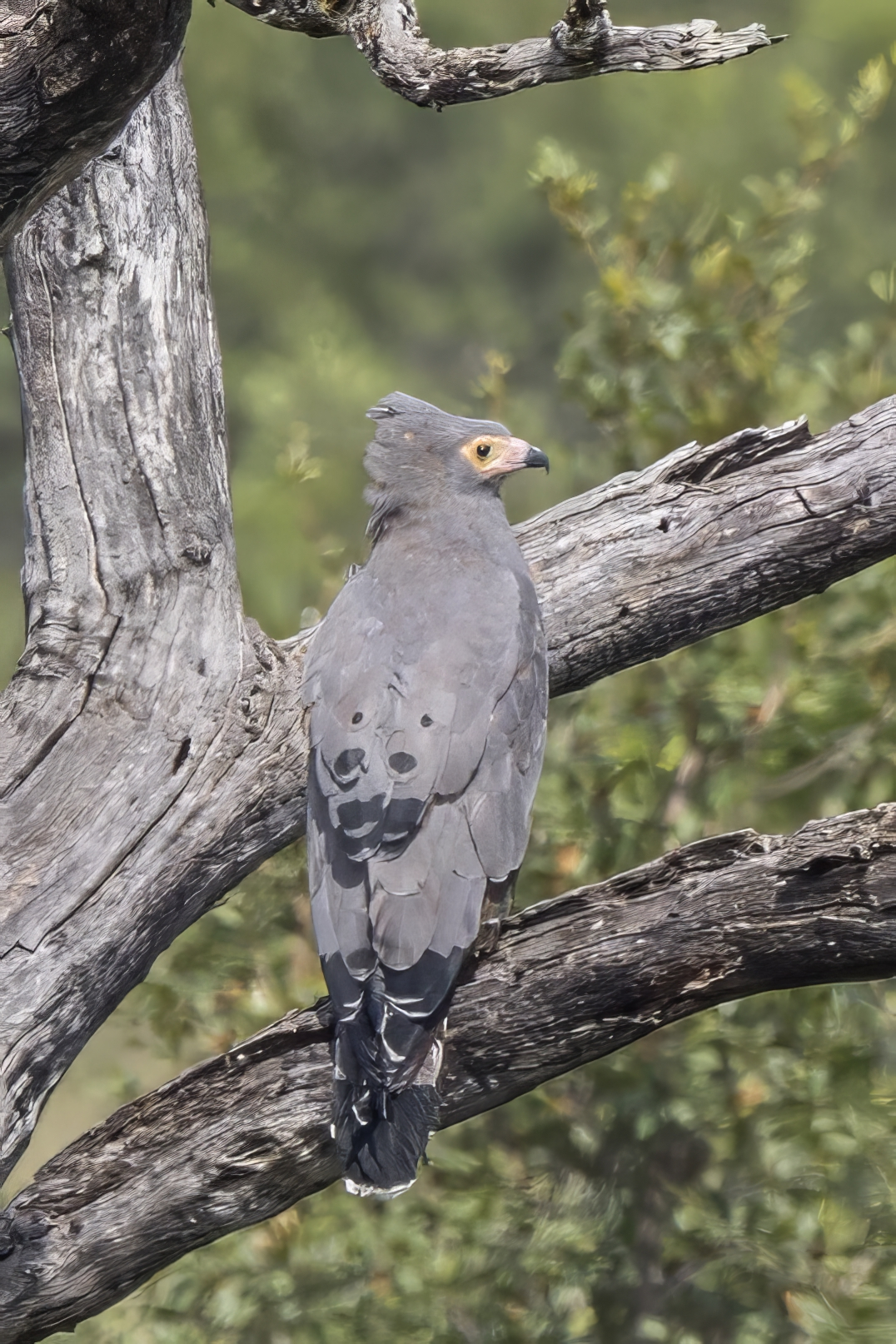
Showing tail feathers, South Africa
