= Milege Festival =

Musical event in Uganda

Milege World Music Festival
- Genre: World Music, Folk music
- Locations: Botanical Gardens, Entebbe, Uganda
- Coordinates: 0.0620109°N 32.4792744°E
- Years active: 15
- Founders: Francis Manana Birabi
- Attendance: 10,000+
- Capacity: Unlimited
- Organiser: Milege Band, Milege Acoustic Project
- Website: Milege World Music Festival

The Milege World Music Festival or just Milege Festival is an annual music festival, happening every November, organized by Milege Afrojazz Band. The festival is a celebration of world music, games, cultural dances, stories, poems, and so on. Art pieces from the Repainting Uganda project are also displayed and sold during the festival. The festival invites many different world music stars from across Africa and sometimes from Asia, Europe, and America. The Milege World Music Festival of 2014 saw Japanese world star and world's first female nyatiti player Anyango perform.

Milege started the festival in 2010, moving across Uganda, but has since 2014 relocated it to the Botanical Gardens in Entebbe.

== Organizers ==
The festival is normally organized by Milege band members, members of the Milege Acoustic Project, and well-wishers. Preparation for the festival starts as early as January.

== List of Milege World Music Festivals ==
Year	Dates	Festival Venue	Performers
2017	24-26 November	Botanical Gardens, Entebbe	Milege Acoustic Project (MAP); The Tabs Ug; Totemo; Bengatronix; KYB Gumboot Dancers; Rockies Troupe
2016	25-27 November	Botanical Gardens, Entebbe	Milege Acoustic Project (MAP); Haka Mukiga; Undercover Brothers Ug (Uganda); Dj Ruck (Uganda); Rockies Troupe (Uganda); MoRoots (Uganda); Daniel Okiror (Uganda); Maddox Ssematimba (Uganda); Pal Musica (Democratic Republic of the Congo); DJ Rachel (Uganda); Drumnation (Burundi); Kyambogo University Students Cultural Associations; Giovanni Kiyingi (Uganda); Bengatronics (Kenya); Deena (Germany/Uganda); Canaan Gents (Uganda); Rachael Magoola (Uganda); Gregg-SS DJ’s (Kenya)
2015	20-22 November	Botanical Gardens, Entebbe	Okeita Akogo; Sandy Soul; Manana and Milege band; Babette Haag; Undercover Brothers Ug; Giovanni Kiyingi; Trizza; Ingyenzi dancers from Rwanda; Watmon Dance troupe; Ojijo the poet; Afrika Jambo Beats; Haka Mukiga; Ruyonga; Jungle; Janzi Band; Patricia Zoe (The story teller); Davis Ntare; King Kash; Santuri Safari DJs
2014	20-21 November	Botanical Gardens, Entebbe	Anyango; Milege band; Undercover Brothers Ug; Giovanni Kiyingi; Annet Nandujja and the Planets; Bolton Sserunjogi; Higenyi Troupe; Afro Simba band
2010	November	The Lake Victoria Serena Resort	Milege band; Janzi Band; Kombo and Afrosimba Band; The Lantern Meet of Poets; Nawany and Kahiri
