= At Dawn (Undercover Brothers Ug EP) =

- Album Cover

EP by Undercover Brothers Ug
- Released: December 13, 2014
- Recorded: 2014
- Genre: World, pop
- Length: 20:06
- Label: Little Penny Studios; Grayce Records
- Producer: Various: Jude Mugerwa; Joseph Mayanja; Andy Music; Nase Pro

Undercover Brothers Ug chronology
At Dawn (2014)	Hit List (2016)

Singles from At Dawn
- 1. "Kilalu" Released: May 13, 2014; 2. "Like a Diamond" Released: June 11, 2014; 3. "Nsikatila" Released: August 20, 2014

At Dawn is the debut EP released in 2014 by the Ugandan music duo Undercover Brothers Ug. It was co-written by the duo and released at their first ever concert dubbed 'Unveiling Undercover Brothers Ug' at Alliance Francaise, Kampala on December 13 and at the Uganda Museum on December 20, 2014. The concerts acted as their official release dates for their first album, At Dawn which sold physical copies at the concerts. The first concert was blessed by a performance by Uganda's king of Mwooyo Maurice Kirya. The third single "Nsikatila" marketed the album which increased album sales in December 2014. The duo released their first music video for the song "Diamond", a collaboration with Ugandan rapper Young Zee in May 2014.

== Singles ==
- "Nsikatila"
- "Kilalu"
- "Like a Diamond"

== Track listing ==
Track Listing
No.	Title	Writer(s)	Producer(s)	Length
1.	"Nsikatila"	Jay K Mulungi; Timothy Kirya	Jude Mugerwa	4:24
2.	"Kilalu"	Jay K Mulungi; Timothy Kirya	Joseph Mayanja	3:47
3.	"Like a Diamond"	Jay K Mulungi; Timothy Kirya	Andy Music	3:45
4.	"Munyenye"	Jay K Mulungi; Timothy Kirya	Nase Pro	3:54
5.	"Mama"	Jay K Mulungi; Timothy Kirya	Nase Pro	3:40
