= Balikoowa in the City =

- Promotional poster
- Genre: Drama, comedy
- Written by: Lloyd Lutara
- Directed by: Kihire Kennedy
- Starring: Marion Asiro; Housen Mushema; Jay K. Mulungi; Monica Birwinyo
- Theme music composer: Undercover Brothers Ug
- Country of origin: Uganda
- Original languages: English, Luganda
- No. of seasons: 1

Production
- Camera setup: Multiple-camera setup
- Running time: 40 minutes
- Production company: Fast Track Productions

Original release
- Network: Spark TV
- Release: May 13, 2016 – 2017

Balikoowa (officially Balikoowa in the City) is a Ugandan drama-comedy series that airs on Spark TV - Uganda. The series is directed by Kennedy Kihire, produced at Fast Track Productions and stars Marion Asiro, Housen Mushema, Monica Birwinyo and Undercover Brothers Ug's Jay K. Mulungi.

== Plot ==
Balikoowa in the City follows the story of "Balikoowa" (Housen Mushema), a villager who heads to the city (Kampala) on an errand to his aunt's daughter "Sophia" (Marion Asiro). He has to deal with the city life for so long as his errand lasts.

== Title theme ==
The title theme for the series is called "Balikoowa" and was composed and written by Undercover Brothers Ug's Jay K. Mulungi and Timothy Kirya.
