= Janzi (musical instrument) =

Ugandan string instrument (Ssewa Ssewa)

String instrument
- Classification: String instrument
- Hornbostel–Sachs classification: (Composite chordophone Plucked)
- Developed: 2015
- Decay: Medium

Related instruments
- Adungu; Arched harp

Musicians
- Janzi Band; Ssewa Ssewa; Giovanni Kiyingi

Builders
- Ssewa Ssewa

Janzi is a Ugandan string instrument invented by the musician James Ssewakiryanga, also known as Ssewa Ssewa. It was vetted and accorded utility model protection by the African Regional Intellectual Property Organization (ARIPO) under the Harare protocol and registered by the Uganda Registration Services Bureau in 2017.

The instrument has been a major instrument in all Janzi Band and Ssewa's performances since its inception, as well as being adopted by other musicians.

== History ==
Ssewa Ssewa wanted to create something which was new and specially created by himself. He had the idea of removing and replacing the nails on the adungu with a more acceptable material in 2014, after one of the members of his band was not allowed to transport this instrument through Copenhagen Airport because it had metal nails as pegs, these being considered a security threat. He later said that he was spurred into action after his adungu broke.

The first janzi was created in 2015 and it was recognized as an instrument and patented by ARIPO and registered by the Ugandan government in 2017. The name originates from the name of the band, which in turn was named after the local name of a grasshopper, because they wanted their music to fly around the world.

Apart from Sewa Sewa and the Janzi Band, the instrument has been used by other folk and world musicians, featuring in live performances by Feridah Rose in Denmark and Giovanni Kiyingi.

Ssewa Ssewa has taken the janzi to universities and music schools in Germany and Sweden, and in May 2019 will be conducting workshops in Switzerland and Germany on the janzi as well as Uganda's traditional instruments.

=== Official launch in Uganda ===
On 13 April 2019, Ssewa Ssewa held the official Ugandan launch for the janzi, at Katonga Hall in Kampala.

At the launch, Lt.-Gen. Muhoozi Kainerugaba urged Ugandan musicians not to abandon their cultural roots, and looked forward to the janzi being adopted by other musicians around the world. Haka Mukiga, Price and Keneth Mugabi played at the event. Ssewa Ssewa started his performance with Bob Marley’s No Woman, No Cry. He then told a variation on the story of the instrument's conception, saying that it was after his adungu was broken and he was waiting for the carpenter to come and fix it that he thought of a way to modernise the instrument and developed the janzi. The whole band then played a selection of songs from their album Eka.

== Structure and tuning ==
The janzi has two long wooden necks, with a narrow space in between. It is made up of 22 strings, 11 strings on either side, which are attached to the sound box with plastic strings. The janzi is amplified and can be connected on any sound systems. The inventor used guitar pegs instead of nails as used in the traditional stringed instrument of northwestern Uganda, the adungu.

"I had to think of how better and modern I wanted it to look like, so I decided to use wood entirely which would give me a distinctive sound that is quite different from the usual Adungu" (Ssewa).

It is tuned in two scales, the diatonic and pentatonic scales. The 11 strings on the left are tuned in the diatonic scale and the 11 strings on the right in the pentatonic scale.
