= Milégé =

Ugandan world music band

Milege

Background information
- Origin: Kampala, Uganda
- Genres: World Music; Jazz
- Years active: 2009–present
- Members: Manana F. Birabi; Paul Owembabazi; Alison Nadunga
- Past members: Joanita Katushabe; Gloria Akugizibwe; Muhwezi Ariho; Allowo Elaine Obbo; Ahuura Andrew; Gerald Mbuya; David Mugumya
- Website: milege.org/milege-band//

Milege Afrojazz Band, commonly known as Milege, is a world music band from Uganda, made up of young talented musicians from Uganda whose enthusiasm is derived from the diverse cultural music traditions of the different tribes of Uganda into which they fuse contemporary elements to express the likeness of Uganda's people in a more current context. As of 2015 Milege's members are; guitarist Manana F. Birabi, vocalist Joanita Katushabe, lead vocalist Gloria Akugizibwe, bassist Paul Owembabazi and violinist Alison Nadunga as a seasoned member.

The band was popularized by their unique signature song Nankasa Zi Wuna and the Milege World Music Festival. The band has also shared stages with some of the biggest names in African music history including Zimbabwean Oliver "Tuku" Mtukudzi, Maurice Kirya from Uganda, Mame N’Diack from Senegal and Uganda's oldest band, Afrigo Band.

On August 12, 2017, Milege won their very first award at Young Achievers Award in a tight race beating The Triplets Ghetto Kids, Eddy Kenzo, Sheebah Karungi and Geosteady in the Creative Arts (Music) category.

== History ==
Milege started in 2009 playing folk traditional Ugandan music using both modern and traditional music instruments. The guitar, the ankle rattles and the traditional drums made the first sounds of the band. The band later managed to acquire more music equipment that enabled it to keep running. Milege derives its name from a milégé, a Jopadhola word meaning ankle rattle whose sound symbolizes the coming of the chief or king.
Milege started exploring the beauty of different ethnicities in Uganda by doing music from different regions of the country. They have made music in Luganda, Runyankore, Luo, Karamajong, Lusoga, Lugisu, Kinyarwanda and English. This helped them to achieve one of their goals which was to promote national unity.
According to Manana F. Birabi, the founding member of Milege, Milege was started up to spearhead the creation of World Class Music rooted in Uganda's cultural heritage
In 2010 Milege Partnered with Uganda Heritage Roots during their Repainting Uganda Tour to head hunt the best original traditional musicians in Uganda. This was aimed at promoting talent and Ugandan culture. Milege also started up a nonprofit project, Repainting Uganda (described below on this page), which is geared towards promotion of heritage arts. The project headed by Alison Nadunga has fed a number of street children and beggars through mosaic art. Repainting Uganda brings music with fashion, design, art, language, poetry etc.

In 2013 Milege started organizing their own festivals which saw their first ever festival, Repainting Uganda – World Music Festival 2013 sprout at the Lake Victoria Serena Resort. The second festival, Milege World Music Festival 2014 “Repainting Uganda” was held at the Botanical Gardens in Entebbe which became the new home of all the future annual World Music Festivals organized every November.

In 2014 Milege started up a regular acoustic night named Milege Acoustic Project every Thursday at the Makerere University Guest House whose aim was to promote talent, culture and socializing. The Acoustic Project grew to make a thousand plus of attendees every Thursday evening at the Guest House within the first month of the project. University students, staff and the general public make the attendance at the weekly event.

== Discography ==
Milege has majorly done live music on stage. Only one E.P Album was recorded 2010

=== Albums ===
Milege released their first studio recorded E.P album in 2010

- E.P Intro

==== Album track list ====
- New Era
- Nankasa Zi Wuna
- Kankutwale
- Agwara
- Wafoyo

=== Unreleased songs ===
Milege has a number of both recorded and unrecorded songs they perform live which include;

Recorded	Unrecorded
Awinyi	Enyunyuzi
Akaburwana	Migration
Latin kok pi ngo	Samson & Delilah
Angélla ft Nawany	Akeyo ft Jungle
Weyo ft Kaz Kasozi	Akadema
Jasmine ft Herbert Kinobe	Ngénda

== Performances ==
Milege has toured Africa and other parts of the world performing at corporate events, concerts and festivals including The Inaugural Ceremony of the Rutgers Offices in Uganda at DSW Bonita Training Center in Lubowa alongside Maurice Hasa and Ray Signature, Young Achievers Awards, Repainting Uganda 2010, 2011, 2012, Blankets and Wine, World Music Day, DOADOA, Milege World Music Festival 2013 and 2014 organized by Milege at Lake Victoria Serena Resort, Bayimba International Music Concert, African Jazz Village with Mulatu Astatke, at The Elephant, a regular show hosted by Kenya's Eric Wainaina in Nairobi, Selam in Ethiopia and many more. The success of Ugandan bands including Milege have influenced solo artists such as Cindy, Lilian Mbabazi of The Sundowners, Sarah Zawedde of Zawee Band, Bebe Cool and Gagamel Crew to start up bands.

== Nominations and awards ==
Awards
Year	Award	Category	Result
2017	Young Achievers Award	Creative Arts (Music)	Won
2011	Olive Gospel Awards Uganda	Best Band	Nominated

== Repainting Uganda ==
Repainting Uganda, the non-profit arm of Milege was started up in 2013 headed by Alison Nadunga majorly to help street children earn a living through collecting rubbish and teaching them to create and sell mosaic art pieces, a thing that also helped in cleaning the city.

In 2012, through Repainting Uganda, Milege toured the eastern and northern parts of Uganda under the theme Essence of Colour looking for talented young people that would get education benefits and career promotion in the arts field. Their final show under the then Essence of Colour at the Serena Hotel attracted huge attraction from the media and the photos headlined The Observer newspaper.

== Milege Acoustic Project ==
Milege Acoustic Project
- Mission statement: "Promotion of Talent by graduating talented individuals to the stage"
- Commercial?: No
- Type of project: Live Music; Free and open to the general public; Open Mic
- Products: Free live music, Open Mic, Story telling, Bonfire, games
- Location: Makerere University Guest House, Kampala
- Owner: Supported by: Makerere University Guest House; Owned by: Milege.org
- Founder: Milege
- Country: Uganda
- Funding: Self
- Status: Ongoing (Thursday Evenings)
- Website: Milege Acoustic Project

Milege started up The Milege Acoustic Project in 2014 to mentor aspiring musicians and a place to socialize and support each other.

The band has also provided support to upcoming musicians during their music shows. A number of musicians that have benefited from Milege include; Undercover Brothers Ug, Sitenda both of Tusker Project Fame 6, Jungle, Nawany Catherine, Tracy Birungi and Deborah Kisakye who are now great independent musicians. Other popular talents at the acoustic project include Trizza, Afrie, Kenneth Mugabi from Coca-Cola Rated Next, Brian Malengye, Wush, Haka Mukiga, The Tabs Ug and many others.

Milege gives the acoustic project active members a chance to perform at the Milege World Music Festival stage.

== Photo for charity ==
On 8 August 2015, Milege together with Maurice Kirya's The Sound Cup sponsored a charity event, Photo4Charity where people would take pictures with their favorite celebrities under the theme "Pose for a cause" that happened at The Sound Cup with performances by Milege, Undercover Brothers Ug, Kenneth Mugabi, Haka Mukiga, and many more artists. The event was to raise money to build a house for a homeless widow from Western Uganda with her six, all disabled, children.

== Members and professions ==
Milege has had the longest list of the number of members. Milege members are professionals from different fields most of whom are practicing their professions which is the reason the band has so many past members.

Category	Member	Role	Profession
Current	Manana F. Birabi	Lead Guitar	Sports Scientist/MBA
Current	Paul Owembabazi	Bass Guitar	Graphics Designer
Current	Daniel Mutembesa	Poet/ Dancer	Information Technology Lecturer
Touring/Seasonal	Nalwebe David	Rhythm Guitar	Librarian
Touring/Seasonal	Alison Nadunga	Violin / Leader of Repainting Uganda project	Public Health Specialist
Touring/Seasonal	Patrick Maasa Birabi	Percussions	Graphics Designer
Touring/Seasonal	Musaazi Ignatius	Guitar/Team Leader Milege Acoustic Project	
Touring/Seasonal	Allan Watson Waswa	Violinist	IT
Past	Gloria Akugizibwe	Lead Singer	Nurse
Past	Joanita Katushabe	Vocals	Telecommunications Engineer
Past	Muhwezi Ariho	Keyboard	IT Student
Past	Nkalubo Peter	Drums (featured)	IT Specialist
Past	Aluo Elaine Obbo	Vocals/Guitar	Lawyer
Past	Ahura Andrew	Piano	Audio Engineer/Music Producer
Past	Doreen Obura	Vocals (featured)	Architect
Past	Awor Sonia	Vocals	Fine Art Student
Past	Deborah Kisaakye	Vocals (featured)	
Past	Gerald Mbuya	Drums	Teacher
Past	David Mugumya	Bass Guitar	Maths Teacher
Other unaccredited members of the band are the members of Milege Acoustic Project

== See also ==
- Undercover Brothers Ug
- Giovanni Kiyingi
- Afrigo Band
- Suzan Kerunen
- Nsikatila
- Sister Charity
- Haka Mukiga
