= Ye'nze =

Studio album by Sandra Nankoma
- Released: 22 February 2018
- Recorded: 2009–2017
- Venue: Uganda, France
- Studio: Little Room Studio
- Genre: Soul jazz
- Label: Sandra Nankoma
- Producer: Kaz Kasozi

Singles from Ye'nze
- 1. "Mercedes" Released: 2010; 2. "Kaddugala" Released: 2017; 3. "Baliba Baambuza" Released: 2014

Ye'nze is the debut studio album recorded by Ugandan soul-jazz musician Sandra Nankoma. The album was produced by artist Kaz Kasozi and recorded at Little Room Studio in Kampala, Uganda and mastered in Paris, France, by David Felgeirolles.

The album was released on 22 February 2018 as a digital download in France where she had been in a three month residency (August – October, 2017) after she had won the music award Visa Pour La Creation by Institute Francaise France and on CD on 11 March 2018 at a press listening session held by Fezah App at Design Hub in Kampala.

== Content ==
The album has a track listing of 10 songs, a poem interlude and an outro poem Paris Monster. The album presents themes about love, the daily struggles of survival, materialism, stigma against dark-skinned women, and poor political leadership in Uganda. All songs on the album were written by Sandra herself and most of the songs reflect to her life and the challenges she has gone through as a woman, and with a real darker skin. She titled the album Ye'nze, a Luganda phrase meaning It's me to reflect herself and her live on the album.

== Singles ==
- "Mercedes"
- "Kaddugala"
- "Baliba Baambuza"

== Track listing ==
Track Listing
No.	Title	Writer(s)	Producer(s)	Length
1.	"Mwisuka"	Sandra Nankoma	Kaz Kasozi	4:17
2.	"It's Alright"		David Felgeirolles	4:02
3.	"Come Over"		Kaz Kasozi	3:35
4.	"Kabiri Kaalili"		Kaz Kasozi	3:42
5.	"Baliba Baambuza"		Kaz Kasozi	3:03
6.	"Two Worlds"		Kaz Kasozi	1:18
7.	"Nzukuuka Ku Makya"		Kaz Kasozi	4:03
8.	"Kaddugala"		Kaz Kasozi	4:33
9.	"Babylon"		Kaz Kasozi	4:17
10.	"Mercedes"		David Felgeirolles	4:38
11.	"Musaiza Wei'ka"		Kaz Kasozi	4:41
12.	"Paris Monster"		Kaz Kasozi	1:41

== Credits and personnel ==
- Sandra Nankoma – vocals, songwriter
- Michael Avron– guitars
- David Felgeirolles – mastering
- Christophe Pittet bass
- Felix Sabal-Lecco - drums
- Kaz Kasozi - Multi-instrumentalist, Sound recording and reproduction
