= Ssewa Ssewa =

- Also known as: Ssewa Ssewa
- Born: James Ssewakiryanga; 25 June 1987 (age 38); Kampala, Uganda
- Genres: Folk music, World music
- Occupations: Musician, instrumentalist, music entrepreneur
- Instruments: Janzi, Akogo, Adungu, Endongo, Endigidi, Amadinda, Engoma, Mbira and percussions
- Years active: 2000–present
- Label: Janzi Music

James Ssewakiryanga Junior, professionally known as Ssewa Ssewa, is a Ugandan live performing musician, multi-instrumentalist, founder of Janzi Band and inventor of Janzi, a musical instrument.

== Career ==
Son of a traditional drummer and a dancer, Ssewa Ssewa has never had any professional training. His first instrument was a xylophone, taught by his mother. He started studying business at university, but after being encouraged and taught by members of his father's band, decided to pursue music.

Ssewa Ssewa started playing music professionally in 2000. He co-founded Janzi Band along with his friends in 2009 and has been the director since then.

He plays nine instruments, eight of them African, and is a professional percussionist.

Ssewa Ssewa has frequently performed live. He has performed on many stages both in Uganda and abroad and has worked with many musicians including the Quela Band, Navio, A Pass, Isaiah Katumwa, Suzan Kerunen, Mame Ndiak, Giovanni Kiyingi and Hugh Masekela. He was one of the main performers at World Music Day in Uganda in June 2017 alongside Apio Moro, Haka Mukiga, Mame Ndiak, Jackie Akello and many others. He performed with Giovanni Kiyingi, a fellow multi-instrumentalist.

In 2024 Ssewa Ssewa performed at the Non-Aligned Movement summit at Serena hotel in Kigo and he entertained the NAM delegates with his cultural music sounds of the Janzi instrument.

== Awards and nominations ==
In 2021 Ssewa Ssewa organised the Janzi awards which happened at the Kololo independence grounds on 11 to 12 December 2021 and happened for two days in the same venue. Ssewa Ssewa has been recognised by different music institutions in the United Kingdom. He was nominated in the World Music Awards in the best world and global fusion award category. Although he did not emerge as a winner, this nomination increased his fame internationally.

== Philanthropy ==
Ssewa Ssewa started a charity organisation called Janzi4Hope aimed at changing lives of vulnerable in Uganda through music activities spearheaded by the Janzi Instrument. In 2022, Ssewa Ssewa and the Janzi Band celebrated the World autism day and performed at the Nile village in Jinja District in Eastern Uganda

== Janzi (Instrument) ==
The janzi is a string instrument invented by Ssewa Ssewa. The instrument has been used on all Janzi Band and Ssewa Ssewa's setups since its inception. The janzi is a based on the traditional harp-like Ugandan instrument called the adungu, but the janzi is different in several ways, unique and patented as a separate instrument.

The name originates from the name of the band.

== Discography ==
Ssewa Ssewa has worked with Janzi Band since its inception and has also worked on his solo projects.

=== Studio albums ===
List of studio albums with selected details
Title	Details
Down in Uganda	Released: 24 December 2021; Label: Janzi music; Formats: Digital download
Janzi2Scales	Released: 24 December 2021; Label: Janzi music; Formats: Digital download
Nva K'la	Released: 26 June 2020; Label: Janzi music; Formats: Digital download

== See also ==
- List of Ugandan musicians
- Isaiah Katumwa
- Giovanni Kiyingi
- Suzan Kerunen
