= Balikoowa =

Single by Undercover Brothers Ug
- Released: February 20, 2017
- Recorded: January 2017
- Genre: Folk; world music
- Length: 3:32
- Label: Slo-Motion Projects
- Songwriter(s): Timothy Kirya; Jay K Mulungi
- Producer(s): Wilfred 'Slo-Motion' Mujuzi

Undercover Brothers Ug singles chronology
"Nsikatila" (2016)	"Balikoowa" (2017)

"Balikoowa" is an ethno folk song by Ugandan music duo Undercover Brothers Ug. It was released on 20 February 2017 as the Original Sound Track and Theme Song for the Ugandan Situation Comedy Balikoowa in the City.

== Background ==
Balikoowa was written by Jay K Mulungi and Timothy Kirya as the title theme song for Balikoowa in the City, a Ugandan drama series in which Jay K Mulungi makes a cameo appearance. The song tells the story of a man named Balikoowa. The lyrics of the song portray Balikoowa's first time in the city, and how he could not fit in. He sees many vehicles and he was almost knocked by a speeding motor bike. Balikoowa is so primitive and he has to face the city.

== Reception ==
Balikoowa received favourable reception mostly around the Buganda area because of its traditional kiganda sound. It has been played at parties and clubs with audiences getting to their feet to dance the traditional kiganda dance. This song has always closed the duos repertoires since its release. The fans even created their own videos of the song while The Undercover Brothers haven't released a video for it.

== Track listing and formats ==
- Digital download
1. Balikoowa – 3:24
