= Jackie Akello =

Ugandan singer/songwriter

- Born: 11 January 1986 (age 39)
- Genres: Pop music; world; gospel
- Occupation(s): Singer/songwriter, fashionista
- Years active: 2009–present
- Website: akellomusic.com

Jackie Akello is a Uganda singer-songwriter and entrepreneur with a coffee brand Village Belle which she launched in 2017. She sings in Acholi, Luganda, Swahili, and English. She is known for her hit love ballad "Amari", the gospel hit "Samanya" with Levixone, and the war-themed pop hit "Apwoyo". Akello is an Acholi from northern Uganda, and most of her songs, like "Apwoyo" talk about the suffering of the Acholi both during and after the Lord's Resistance Army war that left Acholis out of their homes for a long time.

== Career ==
=== Music ===
Jackie joined several live performing bands before going solo. She was a member of Janzi, The Sundowners, and then her own Amari Band. She worked with Levixone on their hit gospel single "Samanya". She also worked with other musicians such as Kaweesa, Suzan Kerunen, Myko Ouma, Tshila, and Kinobe Herbert.

She worked as a backup singer for Lilian Mbabazi on songs including "Vitamin". Jackie took on an acting role in Maurice Kirya's "Busaballa" video as Proscovia.

She has performed on live stages, including World Music Day 2014 and 2017 in Kampala, Blankets and Wine festival, Bayimba festival, and many other private and public events. She also toured France.

Jackie worked on a song titled "Black Yellow Red", an all-star project with Cindy, Irene Ntale, Michael Ross, Viboyo, Nick Nola, and many others. She also collaborated with Mun*G and T-Bro on the song "Ffena awamu." She also went international, participating in the Singing wells projects/Abubilla Music based in the U.K, where she worked with different artists from East Africa.

The singer entertained guests Forest Whitaker during his Ugandan visit to champion peace and development initiatives through young people.

=== Coffee business ===
In 2017, Jackie launched her own coffee brand Village Belle which she said she had had on her mind for a long time.

== Confusion with look-alike ==
Akello has a striking resemblance to Kenyan and Oscar award winner Lupita Nyong'o. While shooting the film Queen of Katwe, most people and journalists that met or saw a photo of Akello thought it was Nyong'o since everyone knew she was in the country shooting the movie. The circus started when Akello's photo was published on Maurice Kirya's Facebook page to promote a music video for the song "Busabala" in which Jackie acted, which raised a lot of attention to the singer.

== Discography ==
=== Albums ===
- Akello Music

=== Songs ===
- Amari
- Apwoyo
- Samanya
- Wan Wilobo
- Hallelujah

== Nominations and awards ==
Awards
Year	Award	Category	Song	Result
2018	VIGA Awards	Jazz-Soul-Country	Hallelujah	TBA
