= Anyango =

- Born: Eriko Mukoyama
- Origin: Tokyo, Japan
- Genre: World music
- Occupations: Singer-songwriter, female Nyatiti player
- Instruments: Vocals, Nyatiti, piano
- Years active: 1981–present
- Label: JOWImusic
- Website: anyango.com

Eriko Mukoyama, known as Anyango, is a female nyatiti player who is well known in Kenya.

== Biography ==
Eriko Mukoyama was born in Tokyo in 1981. In 2001 intended to go to New York City to learn music. But her plans were thwarted by the 11 September attack. She later went to a Kenyan traditional music concert in Tokyo, and its beat changed her life. Normally only men play the Nyatiti, so she became known as the first female Nyatiti player. She was named as an inspiration by the Kenyan musician Suzanna Owiyo, who took up the nyatiti again.

== Activities ==
She was born in 1981 in Tokyo. Since high school, she has been aiming to become a singer and started her musical activities as a leader and vocalist of her band "Taika." In 2001, she went to the United States for music training, but encountered the day of September 11 attacks and abandoned her training in the United States and returned to Japan. She found her musical direction in the Kenyan music she happened to meet in Japan and devoted herself to practicing her percussion. In 2004, she went to Kenya to study music, ignoring the opposition of the people around her. While searching for a balance between a singer and an instrument, she fatefully meets the Nyatiti, a Luo folk instrument.

In March 2005, she traveled from Japan to Kenya and began practicing the Nyatiti in Nairobi. Unsatisfied, she decides to live alone in a village called the birthplace of the Nyatiti and begin her training in the Nyatiti. In May 2005, she arrived in a village in West Kenya, begging a Nyatiti master to become a disciple, but she refused. Because the Nyatiti was a sacred instrument that only selected men of the Luo people could play. The name of the Nyatiti master is Okum K'Orengo. He declined her offer repeatedly. But he finally allowed her to live in the village. Training of the Nyatiti by herself has begun. In July 2005, he saw her enthusiastic appearance and began teaching the Nyatiti. His practice was getting harder and harder day by day. As the Nyatiti improved, she became known as Okum's daughter, Siaya's daughter. On 26 November 2005, a certification test was held in the village to recognize her as a traditional Nyatiti player. The concert was attended by elders from the villages of Luo and several Nyatiti masters. At that certification, she became the first woman in the world to be allowed to play the Nyatiti. In 2007, as a Japanese woman playing the Nyatiti and singing in Dholuo, she became famous in Kenya after being widely reported on Kenyan TV, radio, and newspapers. The Kenya Tourism Board appointed her as a " Kenyan Japanese Cultural Goodwill Ambassador." She performed at a UN ceremony in front of African leaders for the third consecutive year.

- In July 2009, she was selected among "the 100 Japanese most respected people" in the Newsweek Japan. In September 2009, she released her first solo album titled "Nyatiti Diva."

In May 2010, she released her second solo album titled "Horizon."In August 2010, she appeared on the stage at the Fuji Rock Festival, which is the largest outdoor music event in Japan. In December 2010, the second album "Horizon" was selected as one of "2010 CDJournal best disk 100" in CDJournal, which is the most famous music magazine in Japan. In February 2011, she left for France to make a new album. Sally Nyolo, who was a member of Zap Mama, produced this Album and recorded with Anyango at four places in France and Cameroon. In July, she released her CD "Koe wo Kikasete" and published a book "Motto Toku e." The book was ranked first in the music section of "Amazon Japan." In September, she will release her third album "Teï molo." In November, she appeared on TV Asahi's "Tetsuko's Room." In August 2012, she published a book, "Anyango no Shin-Yume wo Tsukamu Hosoku", which was ranked first in the non-fiction section of "Amazon Japan." In July, she visited France and performed in Paris and Bordeaux. In October, she performed in Izumo-taisha Grand Shrine, which is one of the most ancient shrines in Japan. In 2013, regular concert named "Anyango Promenade" was held in Japan. This event was also a memorial event of Kenya's 50th Independence Jubilee. In March, she performed at "Mvet Art Festival" in Strasbourg France. In May her interview was published in "Japan Journal", and she appeared on the cover of that issue. During her World Tour 2013, She performed in Italy, Germany, France, and Kenya. She had acted a radio personality of NHK WORLD Swahili for 3 years. A documentary of Anyango "Alluring African Music" was broadcast via NHK WORLD TV channel on 1 and 2 June. All-acoustic solo mini-album "ALEGO ～Nyatiti no Furusato～" was released on 6 October. In November 2014 she made her first appearance in Uganda at the annual Milege World Music Festival in the Entebbe Botanical Gardens as part of her 2014 East Africa Tour. She released the fifth album "Kilimanjaro" on 28 September. In August 2015, she performed at "Sing for Peace and Hope Concert" on the United Nations Peace Memorial Ceremony Hiroshima, Nagasaki, and Tokyo. and she released her sixth Album "Savanna" in autumn. In August 2016, she released her best album "The Safari of Eriko Mukoyama" in Kenya, Tanzania, Uganda, and she released DVD "Anyango Live in Tokyo" in Japan. In addition, she performed at the reception parties of "TICAD VI" and "Hideyo Noguchi Africa Prize", which were held in Nairobi. She appeared on NHK BS1 "International report 2016 WORLD LOUNGE" on 14 September. In 2017, her best album "The Safari of Eriko Mukoyama" was also released in Japan on 1 January. She appeared on Mainichi Broadcasting System (TBS series) New Year special program "2017 Actually This Person. The World Only One" on 2 January. And she has started to appear regularly in NHK Radio Swahili "NHK WORLD RADIO JAPAN." She appeared on NHK WORLD TV "Taking Tradition to the World" on 3 February. In November, she was awarded "Higashi-Kuninomiya Culture Award" for her 10-year goodwill cultural contributions toward Japan and Kenya relationship. In 2018, she appeared on NHK WORLD TV "Direct Talk" on 22 May. She published a collection of essays, "Nyatiti No Uta" which describes the wonderfulness of life that she learned from interacting with Kenyan people, along with Nyatiti's music on 10 December. In 2019, she released the world remix dance music "KAMBA NANE Anyango Club Remix", which was 7-inch record created by Japan, Cameroon, Kenya, and Senegal.

On 9 May 2021, she released the first full-length album "KANKI" in five and a half years, was a new fusion of world music with Japanese Lyrics. And Anyngo's "KANKI" was ranked first in the new arrival ranking in the global music category of "Amazon Japan."

== Discography ==
=== Nyatiti Diva ===
"Nyatiti Diva" released in September 2009, is her first album.
All tunes are acoustic sound without electric, they are traditional Luo songs arranged by Anyango.

- Title: Nyatiti Diva
- Artist: Anyango
- Released: 20 September 2009
- Label: JOWI music
- Contents:
1. Thum Nyatiti
2. Dodo
3. Matatu ni notte
4. Janeko / Ja Ugenya (Live at Kericho)
5. Nabed nade gijo pinje
6. Koblo
7. Kimi no koe
8. seda (Live at Siaya)
9. Weche ng'eny
10. Nyadundo gacha ywak pile
11. Ne nyako ma go ogol ogol
12. Thum mora
13. Thum Nyatiti （Pakruok）

=== HORIZON ===
"HORIZON" released in May 2010, is her second album.
This album has evolved in more pop and groovier as accompanied with her back band and chorus.
Some tunes are traditional Luo songs, except "Nkosi sikelel'i Afrika," arranged by Anyango, and some tunes are new songs written by her.

- Title: HORIZON
- Artist: ANYANGO
- Released: 30 May 2010
- Label: JOWI music
- Contents:
1. Nkosi sikelel'i Afrika
2. Ochieng Kochieng
3. Horizon
4. Koro aa
5. To thumno ywak kanye?
6. Kaze ～Nyatiti Tatu
7. Sweet Poison
8. Jacaranda
9. Joseph Otieno
10. Akai Daichi ～Red Ground

=== Teï molo ===
"Teï molo" released in September 2011, is her third album.
The mix of the bikutsi rhythm and the nyatiti rhythm will give birth to a new legend in World Music.

- Title: Teï molo
- Artist: Anyango
- Label: JOWI music
- Release: 25 September 2011
- Contents:
1. Anyango
2. Vyumba Vitano
3. Bushman
4. Do Ya?
5. Teï molo
6. Koro azen
7. Lang lang
8. Aye
9. Pangui Dame
10. Le vent
11. Afro blue
12. Te wa sili ma
13. Bimbao
14. Zen ining
15. Mvet

=== ALEGO ～Nyatiti no Furusato～ ===
"ALEGO" released in October 2013, is her fourth album.
"ALEGO" is a name of the Kenyan village where Anyango mastered the Nyatiti.

- Title: ALEGO ～Nyatiti no Furusato～
- Artist: Anyango
- Label: JOWI music
- Release: 6 October 2013
- Contents:
1. Yashi no mi
2. To thumno ywak kanye?
3. Ja Ugenya
4. Kimi no koe
5. Seda
6. Alego (Instrumental)
7. Mungu ibariki Afrika

=== Kilimanjaro ===
"Kilimanjaro" released in September 2014, is her fifth album.
The album is a fusion of African roots music and electro music.

- Title: Kilimanjaro
- Artist: Anyango
- Label: JOWI music
- Release: 28 September 2014
- Contents:
1. Kizash
2. Mwana wa mberi
3. Kayamba
4. Afro blue
5. Last Waltz
6. Ogwang
7. Koe wo kikasete ～Kilimanjaro mix～
8. Uhiki
9. Shiva
10. Amalele

=== Savanna ===
"Savanna" released in October 2015, is her sixth album.
The first instrumental album of Nyatiti by her will invite you to the grand African earth.

- Title:Savanna
- Artist: Anyango
- Label: JOWI music
- Release: 18 October 2015
- Contents:
1. Gaudensha
2. Kariobangi
3. Mashindano
4. Savanna
5. Flamingo
6. After the Squall
7. Old Violin
8. Gaudensha II
9. African Owl
10. Meditation of Motherland

=== The Safari of Eriko Mukoyama ===
"The Safari of Eriko Mukoyama" is the first time for Anyango to officially release her album in Kenya and East Africa.

- Title:Anyango ～ The Safari of Eriko Mukoyama
- Artist: Anyango
- Label: Ketebul music / JOWI music
- Release: 25 August 2016
- Contents:
1. Anyango nyar Japan meets Kenge Kenge
2. Weche Ng'eny
3. Sweet Poison
4. Kizashi
5. Ja Uganya
6. Horizon
7. Ogwang
8. Flamingo
9. Kayamba
10. Gaudensha
11. Uhiki
12. Last Waltz
13. Mwana wa Mberi
14. Nyatiti Soran2020
15. Jambo Nyatiti

=== Nyatiti Soran 2020 ===
"Nyatiti Soran 2020" is a fusion of traditional Kenyan Nyatiti, traditional Japanese Soran-Bushi, and western dance music.

- Title:Nyatiti Soran 2020
- Artist: Anyango
- Label: JOWI music
- Release: 1 April 2017

=== KAMBA NANE ===
"KAMBA NANE" is her Club Remix 7-inch record.
The World remix dance music was created by Japan, Cameroon, Kenya, and Senegal.

- Title:KAMBA NANE
- Artist: Anyango
- Label: JOWI music
- Release: 8 September 2019
- Contents:
1. Side A: Ogwang' (ZDJ House Remix)
2. Side B: Kizashi (HIFANA Remix feat.Latyr Sy)

=== KANKI ===
"KANKI" released in May 2021, is the first full-length album in five and a half years by her.
"KANKI"is a new fusion of world music with Japanese Lyrics.

- Title:KANKI
- Artist: Anyango
- Label: JOWI music
- Release: 9 May 2021
- Contents:
1. Kamba Nane Ga Hajimaru Yo
2. Alego Eno Tegami
3. Kimi To Bokku Sazameku Jiyuu
4. Sekai Wa Tada Damari Sore Wo Miteita
5. Bear Hunting
6. Kibishi Hideri
7. Kanki
