= Totemo =

Israeli singer-songwriter and producer

Totemo טוטמו
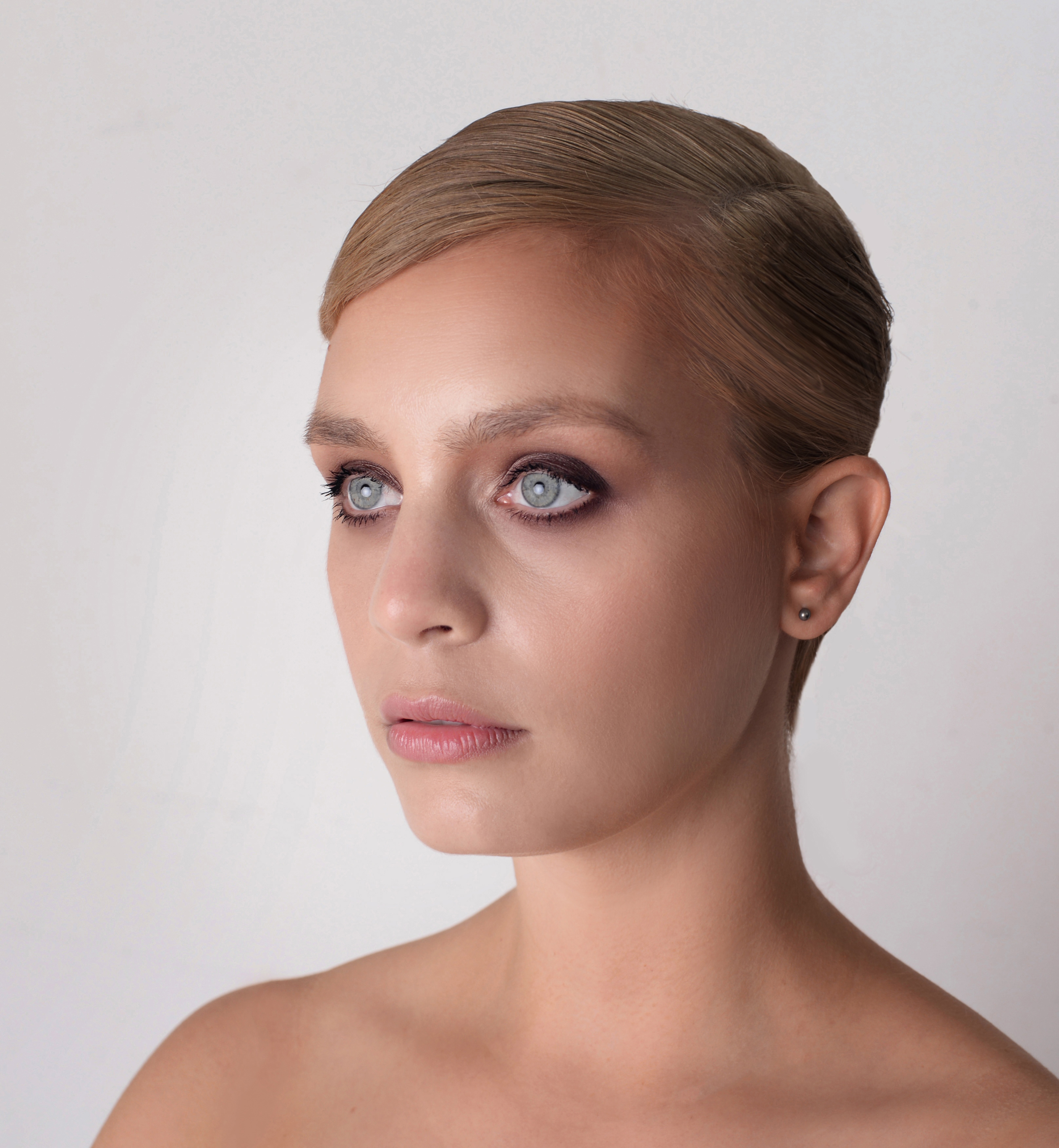

Background information
- Born: Rotem Or; 13 October 1985 (age 40); Tel Nof
- Genres: Indie pop, electronic, dream pop
- Occupations: Singer-songwriter, producer
- Instruments: Vocals, electric guitar, keyboard.
- Years active: 2008–present
- Labels: Anova Records; BLDG5; I Am You Records (IMU)
- Website: imu-music.com/totemo/

Rotem Or (Hebrew: רותם אור; born October 13, 1985) is an Israeli singer-songwriter and electro-pop musician, created in recent years under the stage name Totemo.

== Early life and career ==
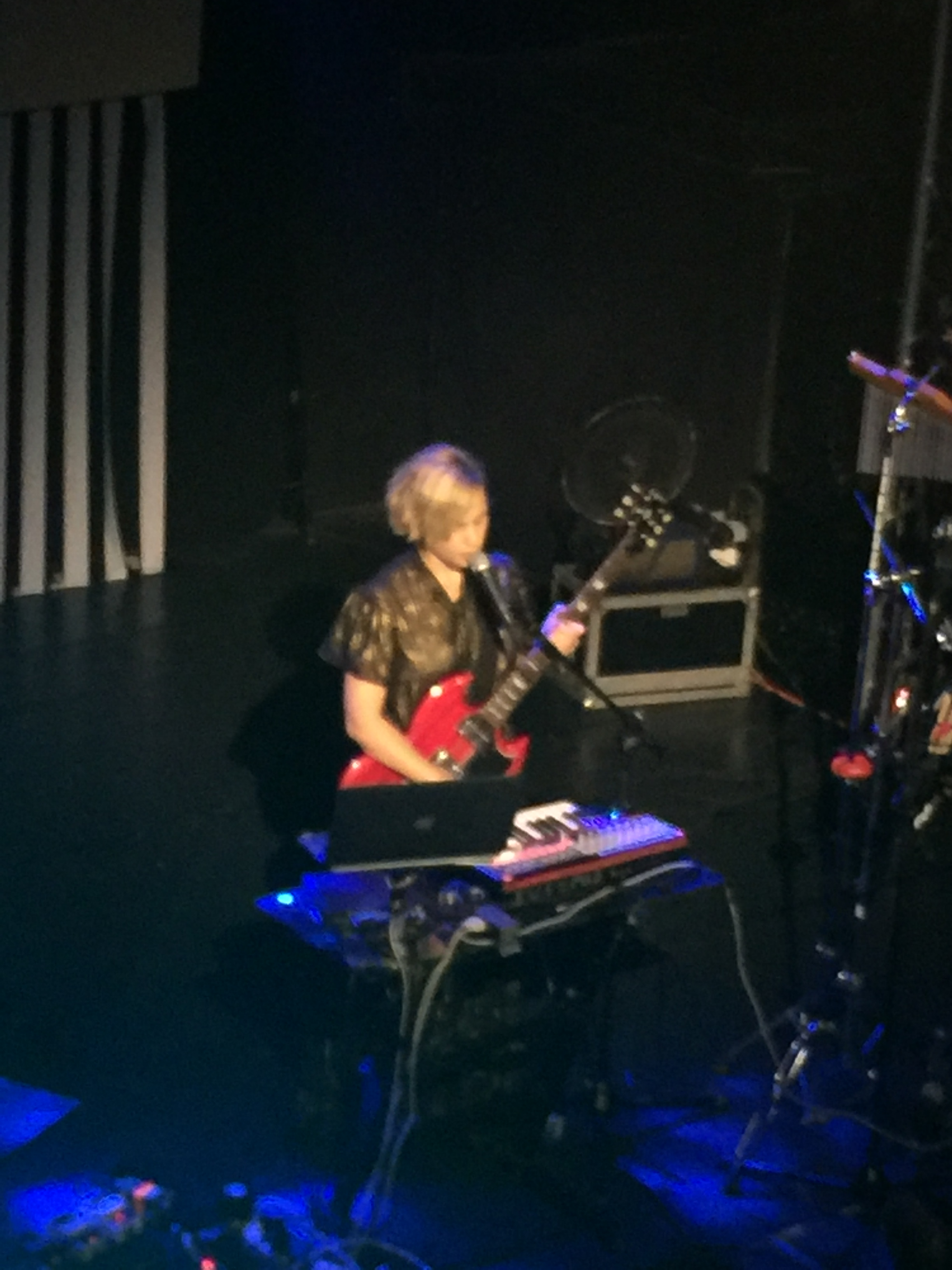
Totemo live in 2016

Or was born in a family home at Tel Nof Airbase. As a child she wandered between the air force bases, Tel Nof and Nebatim, because her father served as a fighter pilot in the army.

From a young age, she posted songs and doodles for the website "Bama Hadada", which eventually led to her recording an album. In 2003, during his military service, he released his first EP, "Lightly Easy", on the Jerusalem independent record company Fact Records. Musical influences can be heard on the album from both veteran producers such as Kate Bush, Simon Wegerfunkel and Leonard Cohen and newer names in the music world such as Fiona Apple, Tanya Donnelly and Cat Power. In 2004, Or recorded a Hebrew version of the song "One of Us Can't Be Wrong" as part of the music magazine "The Blind Server's" Foreign Song project.

In 2012, 9 years after the EP's release, Or released his debut album, "Hard Magic". On this album, Or did almost everything alone: writing, composing, recording, producing and playing most of the instruments. He recorded and edited the entire album in his own home. Musical influences on this album were more recent producers such as James Blake, Feist and Laura Marling. The album received praise and media exposure in the Israeli press and media websites and on various banda blogs abroad.

Totemo has toured the world performing at festivals such as the Milege World Music Festival in Entebbe Uganda in November 2017, the annual InDnegev festival in Israel and Zandari Festa in Seoul in South Korea. Totemo has worked with other Israel artists including Amit Erez, Alon Lotringer, Roey Avital, Mo Kolours and shared stage with a multitude of other Israeli artists.

In March 2019, his first full album called Totemo, "Everything Happens Only Once" was released, a direct continuation of his collaboration with producer Roy Avital.

The album contains 10 songs that Or wrote and produced in collaboration with Avital. The album also features Ran Yaakovovich on percussion and drums and Eden Barkat on saxophone and clarinet. The editing and order of the songs on the album was carried out by his ex-partner, Kwamy.

== Personal life ==
Both Rotem's parents used to work in the Israel Air Force. Rotem grew up on a military base for most of her childhood until she was 12 when her family moved to Modiin.

Rotem Or did her mandatory military service after high school and went on to join the Hebrew University of Jerusalem where she obtained a Bachelor of Science degree in Biology and Psychology majoring in Brain Science.

In 2014 she contracted breast cancer, from which she recovered.

== Discography ==
=== Albums ===
Lightly Easily (as Rotem Or)

- Format: CD
- Label: FACT Records
- Writer: Totemo
- Producer: Totemo
- Chart position: NA
- Tracks: Sniff, Charges, Suzanne, La Dance, Untitled, On the move, Scream

Hard Magic

- Released: 2012
- Format: LP
- Writer: Totemo (As Rotem Or)
- Writers: Totemo (As Rotem Or)
- Producer: Totemo (As Rotem Or)
- Tracks: This Is What You All Came For, Secret Particles, A Little Bird in Your Ear, Dear Sir, Untitled, Human Being, Covers, How I Lost Your Respect, Scholarships, A Flower For You, We Choose Future B
- Singles: Covers

Heavy as My Dreams (EP)

- Released: 2014
- Format: LP
- Label: BLDG5
- Writer: Totemo (As Rotem Or)
- Writers: Totemo (As Rotem Or)
- Producer: Totemo (As Rotem Or), Roey Avital
- Tracks: Heavy as my dreams, Opposite of Charm, Host, Whois, Time to shine
- Singles: Host

Desire Path

- Released: 2016
- Format: EP
- Writer: Totemo
- Writers: Totemo
- Producer: Totemo, Roey Avital
- Tracks: Dreamit, Seesaw, Kick, Hits, Prime
- Singles: Hits
