= Undercover Brothers Ug =

Ugandan music duo

- Undercover Brothers Ug members

Background information
- Origin: Kampala, Uganda
- Genres: World; reggae; R&B
- Years active: 2013–2020
- Label: Platinum Entertainment
- Members: Achi; Timothy Kirya

Undercover Brothers Ug also simply known as Undercover Brothers are a Ugandan music duo composed of guitarist and vocalist Achi and vocalist Timothy Kirya, whose music career sparked off when they won the auditions and represented Uganda in the sixth season of East Africa's biggest singing competition Tusker Project Fame. The duo released their first album titled At Dawn in December 2014. In December 2016, their song Nsikatila was nominated in the Best R&B Song category at HiPipo Music Awards (#HMA) 2017.

The duo has shared the stage with some of Uganda's biggest stars such as Rachael Magoola, Jackie Chandiru, Madoxx Ssemanda Sematimba, Maurice Kirya, Jemimah Sanyu and Chantal Letio.

== History ==
Undercover Brothers Ug landed on the East African music stage when they represented Uganda in East Africa's biggest singing competition Tusker Project Fame season six, though they did not win. Since then, the duo, however, did not look back but instead continued entertaining people with their best guitar tunes and sweet melodies and suddenly they released their first album, At Dawn.

Undercover Brothers Ug held their first ever concerts dubbed Unveiling Undercover Brothers Ug on the 13 and 20 December 2014 in Kampala. These concerts acted as their official release dates for their first album, At Dawn which sold physical copies at the concerts. The first concert was blessed by a performance by Uganda's king of Mwooyo Maurice Kirya. The third single, Nsikatila marketed the album which increased album sales in December 2014. The duo released their first music video for the song Diamond, a collabo with Uganda's young rapper Young Zee in May 2014. The duo was one of the few artists and bands chosen to entertain people on World Music Day 2014 and 2015 organised by Alliance Francaise in Kampala, Uganda. The duo has also performed at different music festivals including Pearl Rhythm Festival alongside Jackie Chandiru in October 2014 after winning the Pearl Rhythm Stage Coach Auditions, Bayimba International Music Festival, Laba Street Art Festival as well as the Milege World Music Festival organized by Milege in November 2014, and 2015, Nyege Nyege 2015 and 2016 where they slayed the festival with a great heavy performance, Kampala Capital City Authority (KCCA) Festival and many more.

The Undercover Brothers, with The Kava Band - a live performing band they formed in 2016, have held weekly shows at different locations in Kampala starting with Istanbul Restaurant early 2016, The Game Club late 2016 and Bubbles Olearys from January to August 2017. While on these weekly shows, the Undercover Brothers have hosted other Ugandan musicians such as Vampino, Chameleone, The Tabs Ug, Kenneth Mugabi, Micheal Kitanda, Levixone, Happy Kyaze and many others.

From mid-2017, Undercover Brothers flanked by their cover band have been playing at Alex Muhangi's weekly comedy show Comedy Store Uganda in Kampala.

== Awards and nominations ==
Awards & Nominations
Year	Award	Category	Result	Ref
2016	HiPipo Music Awards	Best R&B Song (Nsikatila)	Nominated	

== Members ==
- Timothy Kirya is a singer-songwriter, vocal coach, and guitar instructor. Timothy is a lead singer for the Undercover Brothers Ug and sometimes plays the acoustic guitar. He has co-written all songs on Undercover Brothers Ug's At Dawn album including a number of unreleased songs
- Achi is a singer-songwriter, guitarist, actor, model, and owner of Fashion Clinik Ug, a clothing line in Kampala. He plays the lead guitar and sometimes the bass guitar for Undercover Brothers Ug. He has also co-written all songs on Undercover Brothers Ug's At Dawn album including a number of unreleased songs.

Achi debuted his acting career as Henry in a Ugandan television series, Balikoowa in the City.

== Discography ==
=== Albums ===
At Dawn

- Released: 13 December 2014
- Format: CD
- Label: Little Penny Studios, Grayce Records
- Writer: Timothy Kirya, Jay K Mulungi
- Producer: Producer Jude Mugerwa, Producer Joseph Mayanja, Producer Andy Music, Producer Nase Pro
- Tracks: Nsikatila, Like a Diamond, Kilalu, Munyenye, Mama
- Bonus tracks: 2
- Singles: Nsikatila, Like a Diamond (feat. Youngzee)

Hitlist

- Released: January 2016
- Format: CD
- Writer: Timothy Kirya, Jay K Mulungi
- Producer: Producer Jude Mugerwa
- Tracks: Balikoowa, Ani, Nabirye, Kilalu, Olyot'eyo
- Bonus tracks: 2
- Singles: Balikoowa, Ani, Nabirye

=== Singles ===
- 2014: "Nsikatila"
- 2017: "Balikoowa"

== Music videos ==
Year	Title	Producer	Editor	Director
2017	"Nsikatila"	Jude Mugerwa		NG Films Crew
2014	"Like a Diamond" (with Young Zee)	Andy Muzic	Diana Mbondo	Kayode Gbenga

== See also ==
- List of Ugandan musicians
- Jemimah Sanyu
- Ruyonga
- Juliana Kanyomozi
- Maurice Kirya
- Flavia Tumusiime
- Tusker Project Fame
- Goodlyfe Crew
- Milege
- Giovanni Kremer Kiyingi
- Suzan Kerunen
