= Giovanni Kiyingi =

- Born: Giovanni Kiyingi; 3 June 1991 (age 35)
- Origin: Kampala, Uganda
- Genres: World music, Afro Fusion, African folk music
- Occupations: Singer-songwriter, musician
- Instruments: Endingidi, Vocals, The Janzi, Adungu, Akogo, Madiinda, guitar, harmonica, flute, Djembe, Calabash, congas, maracas
- Years active: 2008–present
- Website: giovannikiyingi.com

Giovanni Kiyingi, is a Ugandan folk singer-songwriter and world music artist. He is known for his skills as a multi-instrumentalist who plays the local Ugandan fiddle (endingidi), akogo, adungu, guitar, harmonica, flute, djembe, calabash, congas, drums, and maracas, among others. He was one of the Ugandan artists chosen to welcome Pope Francis to Uganda at Kololo on 27 November 2015.

His skill as a multi-instrumentalist, vocalist and performer have won him invitations to perform at major music festivals and co-operative events in Uganda and the rest of the world. He won an invitation to perform at a landmark yoga event in India dubbed "The unveiling of a 112 foot tall face of the Adiyogi Shiva– the source of yoga'".

== Personal life ==
Giovanni, during his interview with Chimpreports, Kiyingi confirmed that he quit school for a year to concentrate on music.

== Discography ==
=== Albums ===
Times (Album)

- Released: 24 November 2025
- Format: CD & DSPs
- Writer: Giovanni Kiyingi
- Tracks: Ennono, Maama, Kabaka, Nina Owange, Mukisa, Muleke Agende, Mu Bibatu Byo, Mother Nature, Ngalo Bunani, You Are Not Alone, Step By Step, Nantongo

Amakondeere

- Released: 2016
- Format: CD
- Writer: Giovanni Kiyingi
- Bonus tracks: 2
- Singles: Nkwesuunga, Amakondeere

Joy of an African (Esanyu Ly'omufilika)

- Released: 2010
- Format: CD
- Writer: Giovanni Kiyingi
- Producer: Jude Mugerwa
- Director: Giovanni Kiyingi
- Tracks: Joy of an African(Esanyu ly'omufilika), Ssegamwenge, Asante, Omwana W'afilika, Ekyaalo Mpala, Ekibbobo, Kanyimbe, Omukisa Omulala, Omumuli, Naasiwa Mukange
- Bonus tracks: 2
- Singles: Joy of an African(Esanyu ly'omufilika), Omwana W'afilika

== Live performances ==
Kiyingi has performed at music festivals around the world alongside performers like Tanzania's Alikiba at the 2016 Blankets and Wine festival, Kora Awards winner Suzan Kerunen, multiple award winner Maurice Kirya, Myco Ouma, Jemimah Sanyu, Jude Mugerwa, Kinobe Herbert at the Pearl Rhythm Festival 2012, Okello Lawrence and Joel Sebunjo at DOADOA 2014, Brian Mugenyi at the Utam Festival in Kenya in 2015, the father of ethno jazz Mulatu Astatke at Jazz Village Ethiopia, Harry Lwanga, Ssali Muserebende, Kenya's Makadem, Afrigo Band, and Sarabi band.

He has performed at festivals such as the Bayimba International Festival, Pearl Rhythm Festival, the Milege World Music Festival, Santuri Safari Projects, the Kenyatta University Cultural Exchange, DOADOA, the Irimba Cultural Festival in Arusha, Tanzania, headlined at the Utam Festival – Kenya in 2015, Laba Festival of the Arts in 2016, the African Jazz Village, and the Sondeka Festival in Kenya.

He performed at the Blankets and Wine Festival in September 2016 at Lugogo alongside South Africa's Mafikizolo. Giovanni performed with Ssewa Ssewa at 2017 World Music Day at the French school in Kampala, collaborating on each other's original songs.

== See also ==
- List of Ugandan musicians
- Ruyonga
- Undercover Brothers Ug
- Milege
- Afrigo Band
- Haka Mukiga
