= Nelson Mandela 90th Birthday Tribute =

Concert held in London on 27 June 2008

Coordinates: 51.508°N 0.164°W

46664 Concert Honouring Nelson Mandela at 90
- Concert by Various Artists
- Venue: Hyde Park, London
- Date: 27 June 2008
- Duration: 3.5 hours
- No. of shows: 1
- Attendance: 46,664
- Website: www.46664.com

The Nelson Mandela 90th Birthday Tribute was held in Hyde Park, London on 27 June 2008 to commemorate Nelson Mandela's ninetieth birthday (18 July). The concert formed part of the 46664 concert series to promote awareness of the HIV/AIDS pandemic, and came twenty years after the 1988 Nelson Mandela 70th Birthday Tribute Concert at Wembley, held while Mandela was still in prison.

The three-and-a-half-hour concert was attended by 46,664 people. General admission tickets were available for £65. It was broadcast on the internet and Virgin Radio with highlights on ITV1. The hosts were Will Smith and his wife Jada, and June Sarpong, with other celebrities including Amy Winehouse, Quincy Jones, Peter Gabriel, Stephen Fry, Lewis Hamilton and Geri Halliwell introducing artists.

Mandela came onstage himself during the concert, where he made a short speech – to great applause.

== Performers (in order of appearance) ==
- Jivan Gasparyan
- Razorlight
- Into the Hoods
- Sipho Mabuse
- Soweto Gospel Choir
- Leona Lewis
- Zucchero
- Suzanna Owiyo and D'Gary
- Sugababes
- Will Smith
- Annie Lennox
- Agape choir
- Emmanuel Jal
- Jamelia
- Loyiso
- Vusi Mahlasela
- Johnny Clegg
- Joan Baez
- Eddy Grant
- Kurt Darren
- Simple Minds
- Brian May and Andrea Corr
- Amy Winehouse
- 9ice
- Bebe Cool
- Josh Groban
- Amaral
- Queen + Paul Rodgers
- Jerry Dammers

The concert finished with a rendition of The Special A.K.A. song "Free Nelson Mandela" with Winehouse and Dammers joined on stage by the night's other performers.

== See also ==
- List of highest-grossing benefit concerts
