= Suzanna Owiyo =

Kenyan musician and singer

Suzanna Owíyo
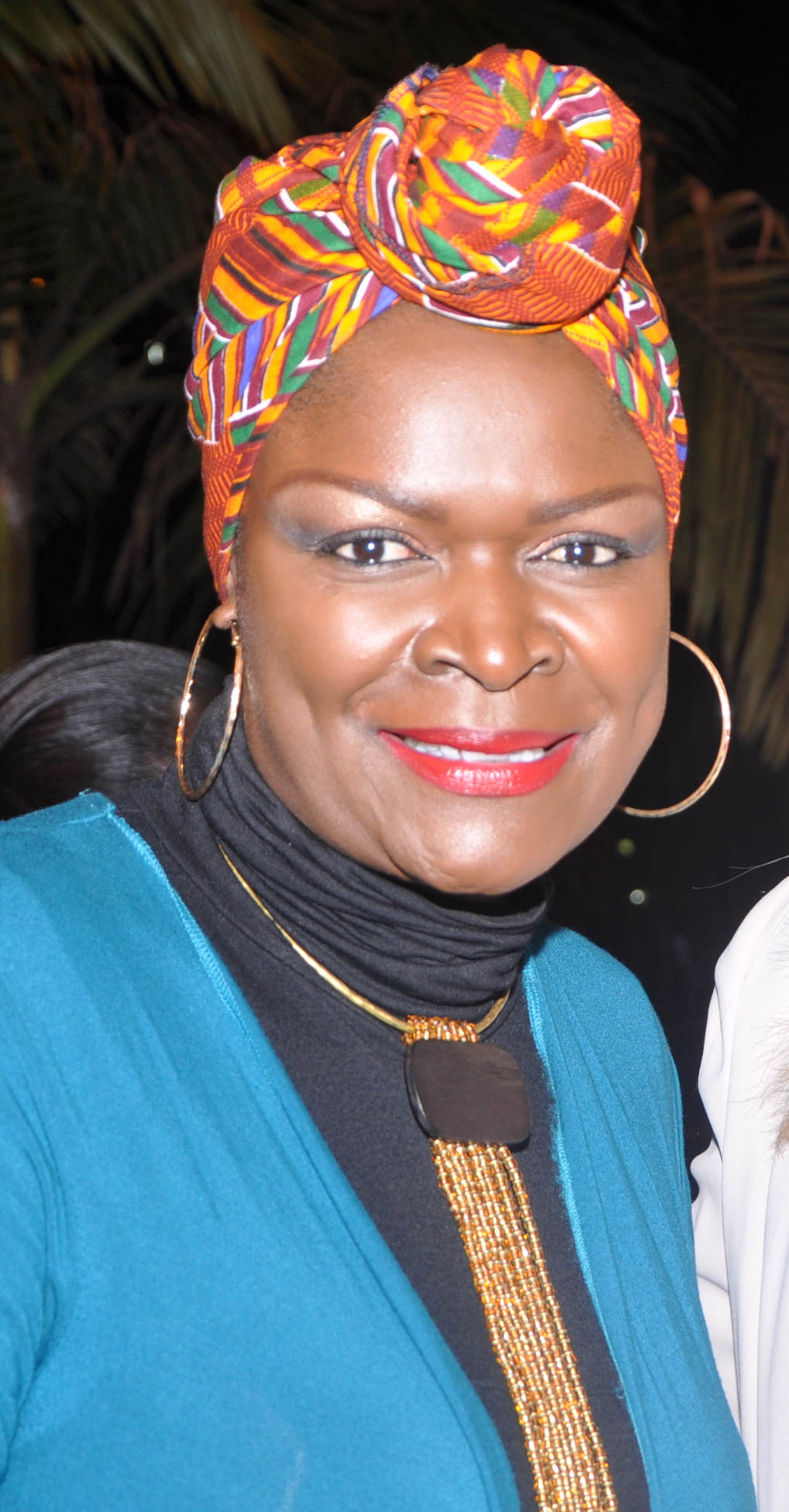
- Suzzana Owiyo at a Fashion Gala in 2016
- Born: May 10, 1975 (age 51); Kisumu County
- Occupation: singer

Suzanna Owiyo (born May 10, 1975) is a Kenyan musician and singer. She is a United Nations Environment Programme (UNEP) Goodwill ambassador and she was awarded the Order of the Grand Warrior of Kenya Award in 2011.

== Life ==
Owíyo was born in Kasaye village, Nyakach in 1975 in Kisumu County. She has a Luo heritage. Her grandfather who played the Nyatiti introduced her to music.

In 2004 she was in Oslo where she performed as part of that year's Nobel Peace Prize Concert for Wangari Maathai.

In 2006, Owiyo collaborated with Congolese singer Mbilia Bel on the single "Kokoka", which earned them a nomination for Best Collaboration at the 7th edition of Kisima Music Awards. In 2008 she sang at the Nelson Mandela 90th Birthday Tribute in London and she was then in Spain at WOMEX in Seville. In 2009 she was at a Mandela Fete in the Radio City Hall performing for 70,000 and a TV audience of 50m people. She joined in as the invited stars sang "Happy Birthday" to Mandela with Stevie Wonder playing the piano.

In 2010 she was nominated for the Radio France International's Découvertes 2010 award. She is a Goodwill ambassador for the United Nations Environment Programme and she was awarded the Order of the Grand Warrior of Kenya Award in 2011.

== Nyotiti ==
She sang and played the guitar until she was reminded of the eight string traditional Nyotiti by the music of Ayub Ogada and Anyango. Her music combines traditional western music and contemporary genres. Her album Yamo Kudho begins with a song that includes music from a Nyotiti and from a Orutu. The Nyotiti was traditionally an instrument played by men but Owiyo and Anyango both became examples to others that women too could play the instrument.
