= Michael Ross Kakooza =

- Born: 1982 (age 43–44); Uganda
- Occupation: musician
- Style: Rhythm and blues

Michael Ross Kakooza is a Ugandan Rhythm and blues musician and dancer.

== Early life and education ==
Michael Ross was born in Kampala in 1982 in a family of 14 to Joseph and Immaculate Kasibante.

== Music ==
Michael Ross started out as a dancer at the age of eight. He released his first single "Senorita" in 2002, receiving massive airplay. The song won the award for best RnB song in the 2003 Pearl of Africa Music Awards. He released after it other songs including "You're the one" which he sang in English. To appeal to a broader Ugandan audience, Ross started singing in Luganda. He released songs like "Yooyo" " Nze Akwagala" and "Ndi nowange". He however continued singing in English releasing songs like "Tell me" featuring Navio (rapper) and "Gimme tonight" that were well received. In 2006 he reseased his album to date "Yo the one". In 2012, he released "Clothes off" which received massive airplay on MTV base. He also released his second album "unstoppable".

== Discography ==
=== Singles ===
- Senorita
- You're the one
- Yooyo
- Tell me
- Gimme tonight
- Ndi nowange
- Its over now

=== Albums ===
- Yo The One, 2006
- Unstoppable, 2012

== Awards and recognition ==
- Best RnB single for "Senorita" in Pearl of Africa Music Awards, 2003,( 2009 Buzz Teeniez Award) for Flyest Video "Tell Me " featuring Navio. 2008 Kora award Nominee,2010 Kisima Award Nominee.
