= Suzan Kerunen =

Ugandan singer and songwriter (born 1983)

- Born: Suzan Kerunen; 12 September 1979 (age 47)
- Other names: Susan Kerunen, Alur Princess, Alur Queen
- Occupations: Singer-songwriter, musician, Tourism Ambassador in Uganda
- Spouse: Jude Mugerwa (m. 2009)
- Musical career
- Origin: Zombo, Nebbi, Uganda
- Genres: World, Folk
- Instrument: Vocals
- Years active: 2009–present

Suzan Kerunen awards and nominations
Awards and nominations
| Award | Wins | Nominations |
| Pearl of Africa Music Awards | 1 | 1 |
| Kora All Africa Music Awards | 0 | 2 |

Totals (Note: Certain award groups do not simply award one winner. They acknowledge several different recipients, have runners-up, and have third place. Since this is a specific recognition and is different from losing an award, runner-up mentions are considered wins in this award tally. For simplification and to avoid errors, each award in this list has been presumed to have had a prior nomination.)
- Wins: 1
- Nominations: 3

Suzan Kerunen (born 1979) is a Ugandan world music singer and songwriter who performs African contemporary music in the local Ugandan language of Alur-Jonam (her mother tongue) as well as in English, Swahili and other world languages. She is a double Kora Award nominee who competed against Ethiopia's Michaih Behaylu, Astar and Bluz and Kenyan Wahu and a PAM Award winner. She was appointed Uganda National Tourism Ambassador to promote Cultural Tourism. Kerunen has shared stages with Africa's best artists and musicians including Kenya's Suzanna Owíyo, South Africa's Yvonne Chaka Chaka, ASA and other Diaspora artists at the KORA ALL AFRICAN MUSIC AWARDS in Benin, Mama Africa Miriam Makeba, Oliver Mutukudzi, Third World, Kinobe Herbert backed up by Soul Beat Africa at The International Jazz Festival.

== Career history ==
Kerunen started her career as a young girl with her two sisters in an all girl group Soul of Africa. She later went on to launch her solo career with her debut Album NIMEFIKA a Kiswahili term meaning "I have arrived".

Kerunen has also performed at major festivals including -The International Bayimba Festival in Uganda, Tusker Experience" at Silk liquid in Bugolobi. She is one of the organizers of the Pearl Rhythm Festival and World Music Day celebrations in Uganda. In 2009, Kerunen performed at The CHOGM celebrations in the United Kingdom and Trinidad and Tobago, Blankets and Wine alongside Eric Wainaina, Radio and Weasel and Janziband.

=== Pimar Crossing Cultures Concert, 2017 ===
In November 2017, Suzan held a concert titled Pimar Crossing Cultures which was held at Sheraton Kampala Hotel. She performed some of her new and old songs including Umbikulumbi, Faithfull, Echuli chuli, Minkulu, Tuk tuk and Tegiri, Olobo, Lek, Anyira, Hakuna, Pimar, Ugorunan, Acher Achera among others. The Concert was to celebrate her tenth anniversary in the music industry and to preserve cultural totems, proverbs, riddles and music. Other musicians such as Afrie, Ssewa Ssewa, Amaru and Giovanni Kiyingi also performed.

== Discography ==
| Year | Album | Tracking |
|---|---|---|
| 2006 | "Nimefika" | Ngom |
| 2008 | "Lek" | |
| 2011 | "Acher achera" | Acha Achera, Anyira |
| 2019 | "Pimar" | |
| 2022 | "From Ashes we Rise" | From Ashes We Rise, Earthly Speaking, Ginya, Esclave, Crimson, Remnants, Kuku, Dek Malakwang, Pirepe, Judong, Aradu, Phoenix (Sourced from Spotify) |

== Awards ==
Awards
| Year | Award | Category | Result |
|---|---|---|---|
| 2010 | Pearl of Africa Music Awards | Best Folk Pop Artiste | Won |
| 2009 | Kora All Africa Music Awards | Best East African and African Artist | Nominated |
| 2008 | Kora All Africa Music Awards | Best East African and African Artist | Nominated |

== Tours and concerts ==
=== Ongea music week ===
Suzan performed at, ONGEA! – The Eastern Africa Music Summit in Nairobi on 28 January 2016 alongside Likizo, Sauti Academy, Wanny Angerer, Parking Lot Grass, Mswazzi, H_Art the Band and Jay A

== Charity ==
=== Know Your Culture Foundation ===
Kerunene registered KNOW YOUR CULTURE FOUNDATION with an aim and vision of branding Uganda, A foundation that dedicates its effort to research, train and groom a culturally aware Ugandans and also promote cultural tourism as a development tool for Uganda .

=== Power of Hope Camp 2006, Kampala ===
Suzan used music in form of therapy and meditation to facilitate a retreat during the Power of Hope Camp; Kampala 2006 with the major theme "Building Community to Living Healthy and Powerful Lives" which was conducted in order to address some of the challenges faced by adolescents at the PIDC, Mulago Hospital.

=== Heart sounds in Uganda "Enkuba Yomutima"2008 ===
Done in the United Kingdom with a replica visit clinic in Hackney London visiting Uganda in September 2008 to highlight Mental Health in Uganda, the project raised awareness of mental health issues in the community, reduced community stigma and discrimination, and empowered sufferers of mental illness by promoting and improving mental health services in both countries.

=== Fight against Cancer ===
In 2012, Kerunen collaborated with Rotary of Uganda on her third album launch, whose proceeds went to the cancer ward of St Raphael of St Francis, Nsambya Mission Hospital which needed completion where she invited other Kora Award winners like Jackie Chandiru and Benon to perform. "It is important for us to pool our resources and efforts to improve the care given to victims of cancer all over Uganda because it affects our mothers, fathers, brothers, sisters and friends."

== See also ==
- Sister Charity
- Giovanni Kiyingi
- Milege
- Haka Mukiga
