= National Botanical Gardens (Uganda) =

Nature park in Entebbe, Uganda

Botanical Gardens, Entebbe
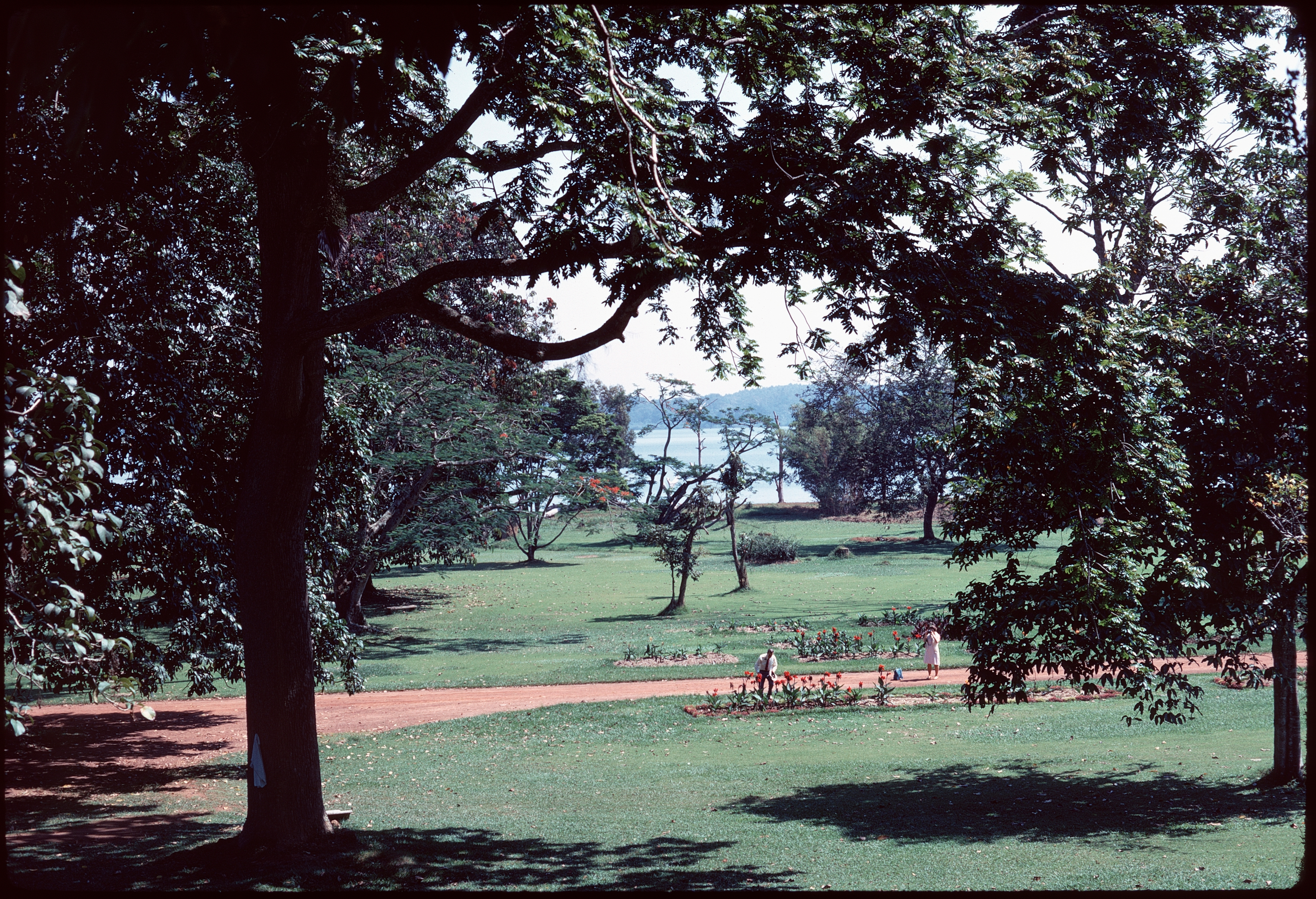
- National Botanical Gardens Uganda
- Interactive map of Botanical Gardens, Entebbe
- Type: Botanical
- Location: Entebbe, Uganda
- Coordinates: 0.0620°N 32.4793°E
- Opened: 1898

The National Botanical Gardens of Uganda, commonly known as the Botanical Gardens Entebbe, are located in Entebbe, Uganda. They were laid out in 1898 by the first curator, A Whyte, close to the shores of Lake Victoria. The gardens are divided into different zones, including a rainforest zone. This rainforest formed the backdrop to scenes from the Tarzan films featuring Johnny Weissmuller, shot in the 1940s.

== Notable birds found in the gardens ==
- Hornbills
- Marabou stork

== Notable animals found in the gardens ==
- Black-and-white colobus monkeys

== Events ==
A number of events have been held in the Botanical Gardens including bird watching, biking, nature walks music festivals, monkey feeding and so on.
The Milege World Music Festival happens every November with live music, games, camping and so on in the gardens.
