= Nyatiti =

Musical instrument

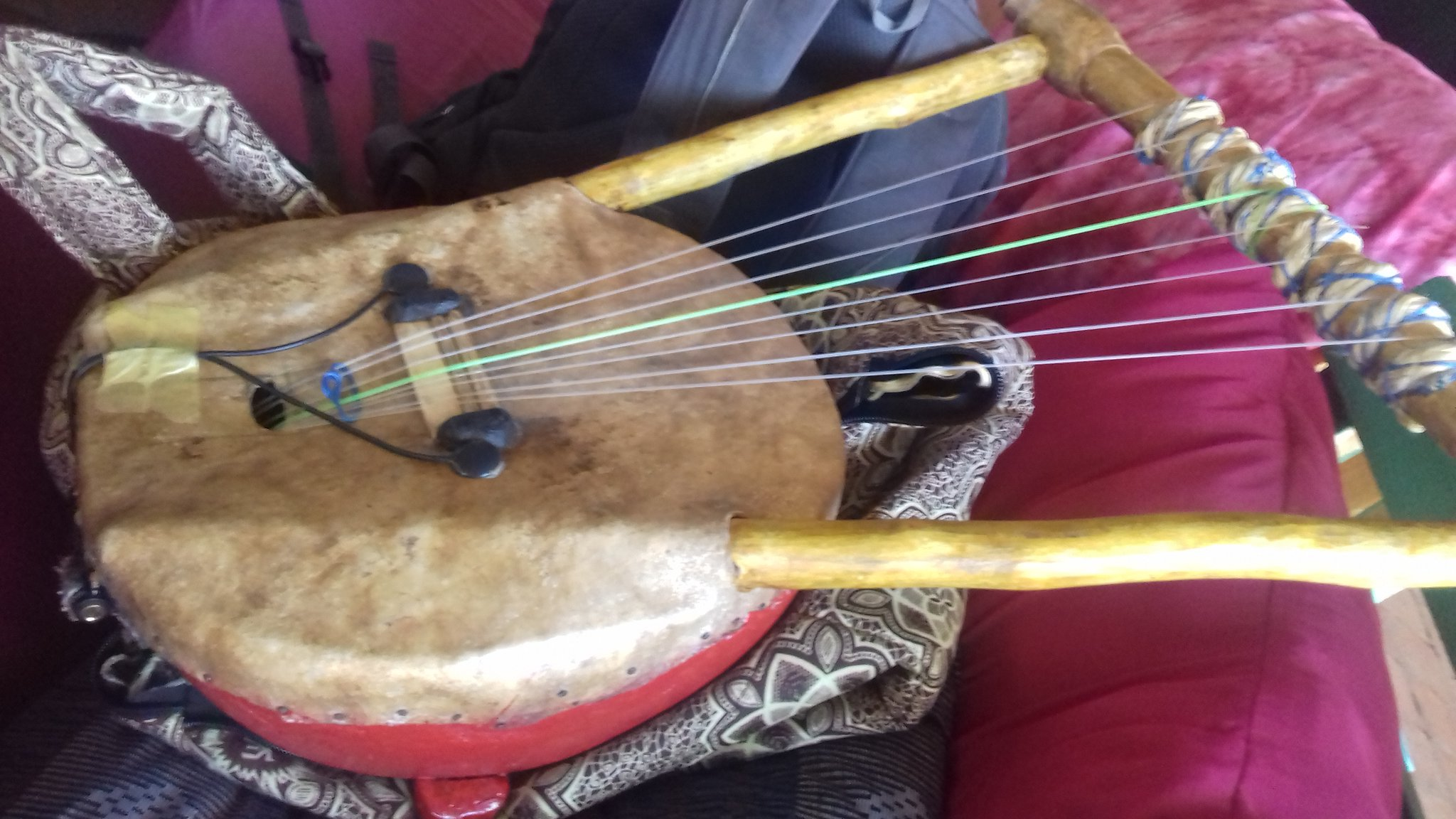
Nyatiti

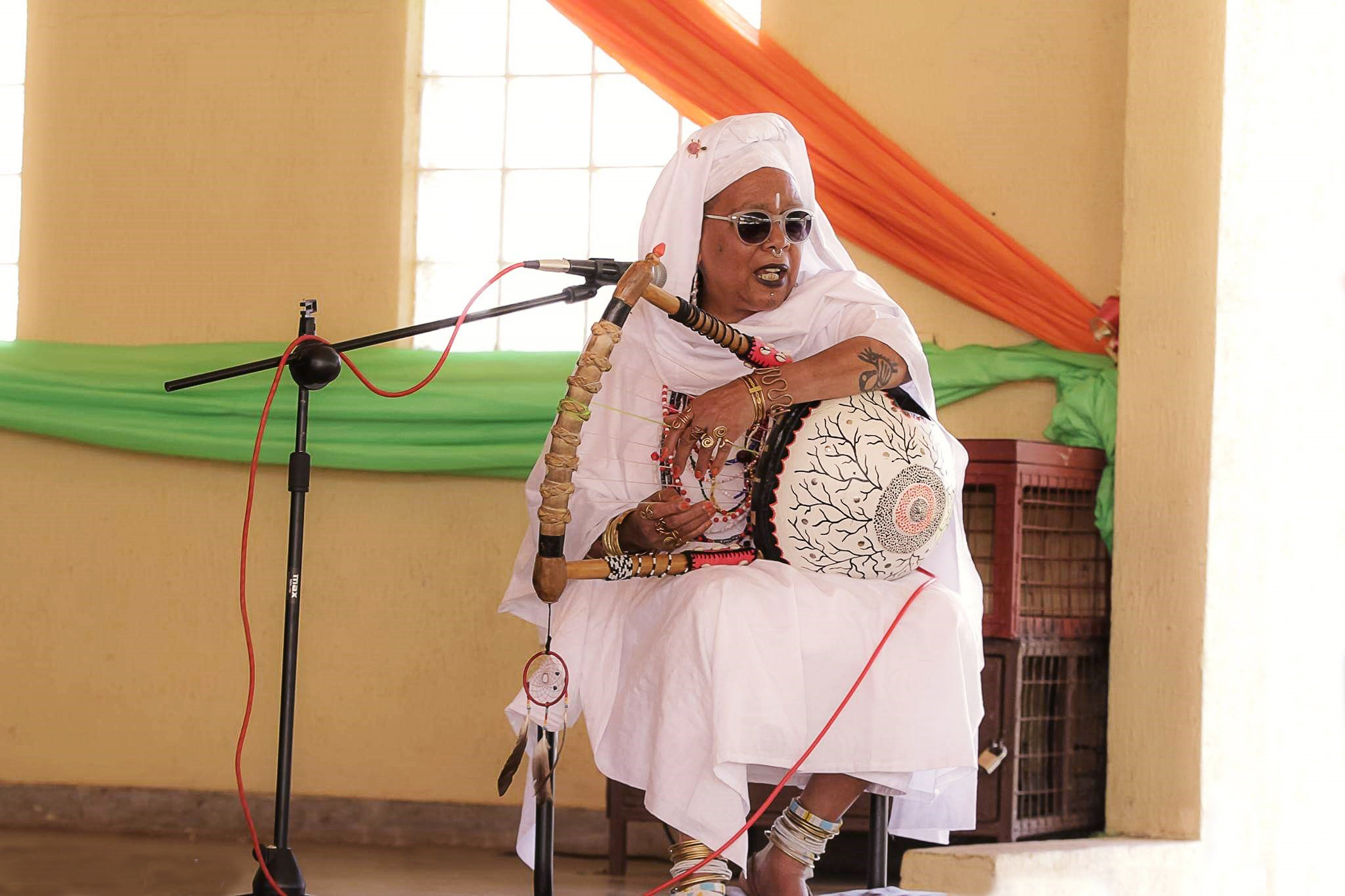
Nyatiti played in Tanzania during a school cultural day

The nyatiti is a five to eight-stringed plucked bowl yoke lute from Kenya. It is a classical instrument played by the Luo people of Western Kenya, specifically in the Siaya region north of Kisumu. It is about two to three feet long with a bowl-shaped, carved wood resonator covered in cow skin. Historically, strings were fashioned from cattle tendons, but modern players almost exclusively use nylon and plastic fishing line of various sizes, a move which changed the sound of the nyatiti drastically.

The nyatiti as played in Kenya usually has eight strings. Though the register will vary to match a comfortable singing range of the player, a typical tuning will be, from top to bottom, B-A-G#-E-E-D-B-A, where the outside strings are the same note at the same pitch, and the middle two are an octave apart. Many modern players use individual tunings to match their particular musical style. The most common playing style uses the thumb and middle finger of both hands, alternating between the two to create a rhythmic and circular musical pattern.

If played in a traditional style, the performer sits on a short, shin level chair called the orindi. The player wears a wrought iron ring called the oduong'o around the big toe of the right foot and the gara, a set of metal bells also on the right leg. With the gara and the oduong'o, the player maintains a constant beat, banging the iron ring on the bottom bar of the nyatiti.

The nyatiti is usually played alone. Some players have, in the past, been accompanied by a number of male back-up singers (chorus). Though not common, the nyatiti can be accompanied by any number of traditional instruments, including a curved horn called the oporo or tung', a single-string violin-like instrument called the orutu, and percussion. Modern day players will often integrate the instrument in with Western-style guitar, bass, keyboards and drums.

Traditionally, players wear a headdress called Kondo, which is fashioned out of goat fur. Dancers sometimes accompany the nyatiti player and wear brightly colored skirts called Owalo, which are fashionably made out of sisal fibers. Younger players often forgo the traditional dress, opting for clothes typical of present-day performances.

Some maintain that music from the nyatiti inspired what became benga music.

== Notable nyatiti players ==
- Ayub Ogada
- Eriko "Anyango" Mukoyama
- Charlotte_Hill_O'Neal (Mama C)
- Rapasa Nyatrapasa Otieno
- Obondi Diel Matara
- Dr. Pete Larson
- Thadayo Mtumra
- William Ogutu
- Amolo Kongo
- Andrew Bird, who played it in the song "Nyatiti" in 'Useless Creatures'
- Daniel Onyango
- James Obwanda
- Kake Wakake
- Lucas Odote
- Oduor Nyagweno
- Okumu K'orengo
- Ogola Opot
- Ogwang "Lelo" K'Okoth
- Isaac Anyanga
- Joseph Nyamungu
- Jennifer Atieno Sanna (a.k.a. Ati Sanna)
- Faith Oduor
- Demba Ochenga
- Achieng Odonge
- Makadem (Charles Adamson)
