= Pearl Rhythm Festival =

Musical event in Uganda

- Status: Active
- Genre: World Music, Folk music
- Frequency: Annually
- Venue: Uganda National Cultural Centre
- Locations: Uganda National Cultural Centre, Kampala
- Country: Uganda
- Years active: 13
- Founder: Jude Mugerwa, Suzan Kerunen
- Previous event: 24 - 26th November 2017
- Next event: November 2018
- Participants: Various
- Attendance: 5,000+
- Capacity: Unlimited
- Major events: Live Music
- Leader: Suzan Kerunen
- Organiser: Pearl Rhythm Foundation
- Sponsor: Various

Pearl Rhythm Festival is a world music festival organized by the Pearl Rhythm Foundation to celebrate Ugandan music and hosted annually at the National Theatre. The festival is the climax of all the activities in the Pearl Rhythm Foundation... Preparations for the festival always start at the start of the year with auditions, training, recording and activation performances and then the festival towards the end of the year.

== Process ==
Every year, the Pearl Rhythm Foundation searches for young and fresh artists to mentor. Four winners are chosen and each gets a single recording deal, publicity, and a chance to perform at the festival. Prior to recording and festival performance, the four winners go through a three months extensive training program and monthly activation performances at the National Theatre to prepare them for the festival stage. Most of the musicians that have performed at the Pearl Rhythm Festival have gained from the Pearl Rhythm Stage Coach.

== History ==
The festival was started by Pearl Rhythm Foundation, which is a Ugandan grassroots music and creative community, for the purpose of strengthening an independent music scene in Uganda. It was started by producer and sound engineer Jude Mugerwa and Kora Award nominee and singer Suzan Kerunen, Myko Ouma, Ambrose Mugume and Rose Kerunen.

The Pearl Rhythm Festival was initiated in December 2012. The festival started off with the support of development partners like Alliance Française, Uganda German Cultural Society, and a collection of early supporters in Uganda’s private sector. It was first hosted by AFK/UGCS on Mackinnon road for two years (2012 and 2013), and then progressed to be hosted at the Uganda National Cultural Centre (National Theatre), where it has been based ever since.

The Festival’s attendance has grown steadily, from 100 people in its first year, growing to 500 in 2013, approximately 800 in 2014 and over 1000 in 2016.

The festival has discovered, mentored and introduced new artists through its Stage Coach program. These artists include: The Undercover Brothers, Hakim Kiwanuka, Jamila Nasanga and Giovanni Kiyingi, Arpeggio Charles Obina, and Raymond Parwot, Afrie Nasanga, Haka Mukiga, J.wonder and Lynn Aineomugisha

== List of Pearl Rhythm Festival Editions ==
Year	Festival Venue	Performers
2018	Uganda National Cultural Centre	Sandra Kay
2017		
2016	Uganda National Cultural Centre	Sylvester and Abramz; Myko Ouma; Lily Kadima; Derrick Komakech; Wake; JAQ Deweyi; Bantu Clan; Baximba Waves; Happy Kyazze; Faizal Damba; Mostrixx; Triza
2015	Uganda National Cultural Centre	Haka Mukiga; Anne Nassanga (Afrie); J. Wonder; Lynn Aineomugisha; Karim Ssava; Sammy Kasule; Joe Kahirimbanyi; Greg Tendwa; Bengatronics (from Kenya); Michael Kitanda; Jah Liya
2014	Uganda National Cultural Centre	Watmon Cultural Troupe; Elvis Kabwondera; Charles Obina; Raymond Parwot; Undercover Brothers Ug; Clarissa Nabulime & Lily Kadima
2013		Jackie Akello; Rachael Magoola; Suzan Kerunen; Hakim Kiwanuka; Myko Ouma; Jamal; Kaz Kasozi
2012		Qwella; Benon Mugumbya; Samuel Ibanda; Pragmo; Zivu Culture; Suzan Kerunen; Ssali Muserebende; Tshila; Soul Beat Africa; Karim Saava; Jackie Akello; Acaye Pamela; Irene Ntale; Joel Sebunjo; Anique; Myko Ouma; Winston Mukasa; Harry Lwanga; Fr. Ssenfuma
