= 91.3 Capital FM =

Capital FM Uganda
- Kampala; Uganda
- Broadcast area: Kisementi, Kololo, Kampala
- Frequency: 91.3 MHz

Programming
- Language: English
- Format: Urban music, news and information

Ownership
- Owner: Kin Kariisa (Acquired in 2026)
- Operator: Next Media Services
- Sister stations: Beat Fm Uganda, Kiis FM Uganda

History
- First air date: December 31, 1993

Links
- Webcast: Listen online
- Website: capitalradio.co.ug

Capital FM (sometimes called Capital Radio or 91.3 Capital FM) is an English radio channel broadcasting from Kampala, Uganda at 91.3 MHz and covers the whole of Uganda with some parts of Northern Tanzania, Rwanda, Eastern Congo, and western Kenya. It covers the rest of the world through a streaming service on the station's website. it is owned by Next Media Services led by Kin Kariisa .

Aside from the 91.3 MHz frequency which broadcasts from Kampala, the radio station also broadcasts on 90.9 MHz in Mbale, 96.9 MHz in Gulu, and 89.4 MHz in Fort Portal and 88.7 MHz in Mbarara. This wide coverage makes Capital FM the most listened to radio station in Uganda.

Capital FM's programs include the Big Breakfast Show, The Capital Gang, The Late Date, Dance Force, AM-PM Show, The Overdrive and The Dream Breakfast.

== Presenters ==
- Flavia Tumusiime
- Gaetano Jukko Kagwa
- Lucky Mbabazi

Day		Program/show	Time	Presenter(s)
Weekdays	Monday to Friday	Gaetano & Lucky in the Morning	5 am – 10 am	Gaetano Kagwa
Weekdays	Monday to Friday	Gaetano & Lucky in the Morning	5 am – 10 am	Lucky Mbabazi
Weekdays	Monday to Friday	Am - Pm Show	10 am – 3 pm	Flavia Tumusiime
Weekdays	Monday to Friday	The Overdrive Show	3 pm – 6 pm	Malaika
Weekdays	Monday to Friday	The Overdrive Show	3 pm – 6 pm	Oulanyah
Weekdays	Monday to Friday	The 8 to 8 Countdown and UControl	7 pm – 10 pm	Arinaitwe Innocent Levy
Weekdays	Monday to Friday	The Late Date	10 pm – 1 am	Arinaitwe Innocent Levy
Weekends	Saturdays	The Dream Breakfast	6 am – 10 am	Moses Kalule, Allen Kirungi
Weekends	Saturdays	The Dream Breakfast	6 am – 10 am	Ramesh Gabalsing
Weekends	Saturdays	The Capital Gang	10 am – 12 pm	Ssemweya Musoke
Weekends	Saturdays	The Saturday Drive	4 pm – 6 pm	
Weekends	Saturdays	Countdown	6 pm – 8 pm	Arinaitwe Innocent Levy
Weekends	Saturdays	The Danceforce	8 pm – 2 pm	DJ Wil 'The Smooth Spinner'
Weekends	Sundays	The Sunday Inspiration Show	6 am – 10 am	Moses Kalule
Weekends	Sundays	Your Choice	12 pm – 3 pm	Ailen
Weekends	Sundays	The Sunday Drive	4 pm – 7 pm	
Weekends	Sundays	Desert Island Discs	7 pm – 8 pm	Simon Kasyate
Weekends	Sundays	Capital Gold	8 pm – 2 pm	

== The brain game ==
"The brain game" is a program run by Capital Radio. Each hour, during the day, the same question is asked. If the right answer is not given, Uganda Shs. 10,000 is added to the jackpot until the next hour, when the same is repeated. The brain game can go on for over eight months as listeners call in, trying to win the money.

== Former presenters ==
- Jackie Lumbasi - The Big Breakfast now Gaetano & Lucky in the Morning, Your Choice
- Juliana Kanyomozi - Your Choice, The Overdrive Show (then Home Run Team with Gaetano)
- Christine Mawadri - The Big Breakfast Show
- Lilian Mbabazi - The Big Breakfast Show
- Karitas Karisimbi The Big Breakfast Show
- Joy Doreen Biira - The Dream Breakfast Show, Sunday Drive
- Alan Kasujja - The Big Breakfast Show, Desert Island Discs
- Cleopatra Koheirwe - The Overdrive Show, The Dream Breakfast Show
- Tattu Sophie - The Dream Breakfast/The Overdrive Show/Saturday Drive
- Marcus Kwikiriza - The Big Breakfast
- Flo Qitui - Your Choice
