= Jackie Lumbasi =

Kenyan media personality (born 1979)

- Born: 1979 (age 46–47); Kitale, Trans-Nzoia District, Kenya
- Education: UMCAT, Namasagali University, Cavendish University
- Occupations: Radio and TV personality
- Presenting career
- Show: The Real Talk
- Station: Rwanda Television
- Time slot: Saturday 7pm CAT
- Style: News, entertainment, gossip
- Country: Rwanda
- Other name: Jackline Nake
- Education: UMCAT School of Journalism and Mass Communication, Uganda, Namasagali University, Cavendish University, Uganda
- Years active: 2006–present
- Employer(s): Rwanda Television, 94.3 Royal FM (since 2018); 91.3 Capital FM (2008-2018); Uganda Broadcasting Corporation
- Known for: The Big Breakfast Show on 91.3 Capital FM; Your Choice; on 91.3 Capital FM

Jackie (Jackline) Nake Lumbasi is a Kenyan media personality currently working in Kigali, Rwanda. She co-hosted the Big Breakfast Show on 91.3 Capital FM from 2008 to 2018 with a number of presenters including Gaetano Kagwa, Ramesh Gabalsing, Alan Kasujja, Marcus Kwikiriza and Oulanya. She read the evening news on UBC in Uganda from 2008 until 2014.

Lumbasi went off Capital FM airwaves in February 2018 and joined an off-air position at the same station after a full reshuffle of the Big Breakfast Show. She soon moved to Rwandan-based Royal FM to do a morning show in the English language alongside Kwizera.

She is known for her husky voice and hearty laugh, and was once mentioned among the highest-paid radio presenters in Uganda.

== Career ==
Lumbasi started her media career as a presenter at a Christian radio station, Power FM, in Kampala. She then moved to Capital FM Uganda. There, she started hosting the breakfast show in 2008 after the departure of Lilian Mbabazi until 2018 when the whole breakfast show was reshuffled. She revealed her departure in one of Flavia Tumusiime's video diaries shared on Tumusiime's and Capital FM's Facebook page. She immediately got an offer in Kigali, Rwanda in March 2018 to host the breakfast show with Kwizera. Lumbasi joked about the fact that she has worked with people whose names start with the letter K, citing Alan Kasujja, Marcus Kwikiriza, Gaetano Kagwa and Kwizera Arnold.

In 2019, Lumbasi was appointed acting station manager of Royal FM, a position in which she served until April 2022.

In 2021, Lumbasi became the first non-RBA journalist to interview President Paul Kagame alongside RBA senior journalist Cleophas Barore. When she was asked how it felt, she said she lacked the right words to describe the feeling of sitting across from a man she had long admired and conversing with him for over an hour. {https://www.youtube.com/watch?v=MlVWou8Oiq4}

She previously met the former president of Nigeria Olusegun Obasanjo and interviewed him for her breakfast show, although the interview was never aired for technical reasons. She also once had a one-on-one conversation with former president of Kenya, the late Daniel Arap Moi, during a visit to Kampala, Uganda.

In addition to her broadcasting career, Jackie works as an event moderator and master of ceremonies for various organizations.

She is also a voice-over artist delivering performances for commercials, features, short films, and documentaries.

== Education ==
She has a Diploma in Journalism and Mass Communication from UMCAT, Uganda, Bachelor's degree in Communication and Human Resource Management from Namasagali University (now defunct) and a Master's degree in International Relations and Diplomatic Studies from Cavendish University, Uganda.

== Awards and nominations ==
Awards
Year	Award	Category	Result
2015	The Media Challenge Award	The Rosemary Nankabirwa Best Female News Anchor	Nominated
2015	Best of the Best Awards (BBA)	Best News Anchor Award	Nominated

Media offices
Preceded by	Presenter of Kigali in the Morning on Royal FM, Rwanda; 2018–present	Succeeded by

Media offices
Preceded by Gaetano Kagwa; Lilian Mbabazi	Presenter of Big Breakfast Show on 91.3 Capital FM; 2009–2018	Succeeded by Gaetano Kagwa; Lucky Mbabazi

Media offices
Preceded by Juliana Kanyomozi	Presenter of Your Choice on 91.3 Capital FM; 2009–2018	Succeeded by Flo Qitui
