= Mercy Nalugo =

Mercy Nalugo is a Ugandan journalist and writer for the Nation Media Group in Nairobi, Kenya, and Daily Monitor, a national newspaper publication company based in Kampala. She analyses news stories and writes articles for Sunday monitor, a weekend publication run by Daily Monitor. Nalugo has covered other stories like the HIV/AIDS prevention and control Bill, an Act of parliament passed into law in 2011 to control the spread of HIV/AIDS in Uganda.

Mercy worked as a Regional Editor for Hoima and Buliisa with the Nation Media Group under Daily Monitor and also supervised other editors within the region. As an editor for the Daily Monitor newspaper publication, Mercy conducts fact checking to verify fake or altered information to prevent misinformation to the public.

== See also ==
- Samson Kasumba
- Mildred Tuhaise
- Daniel Kalinaki
