= Jackie Chandiru =

Ugandan musician (born 1984)

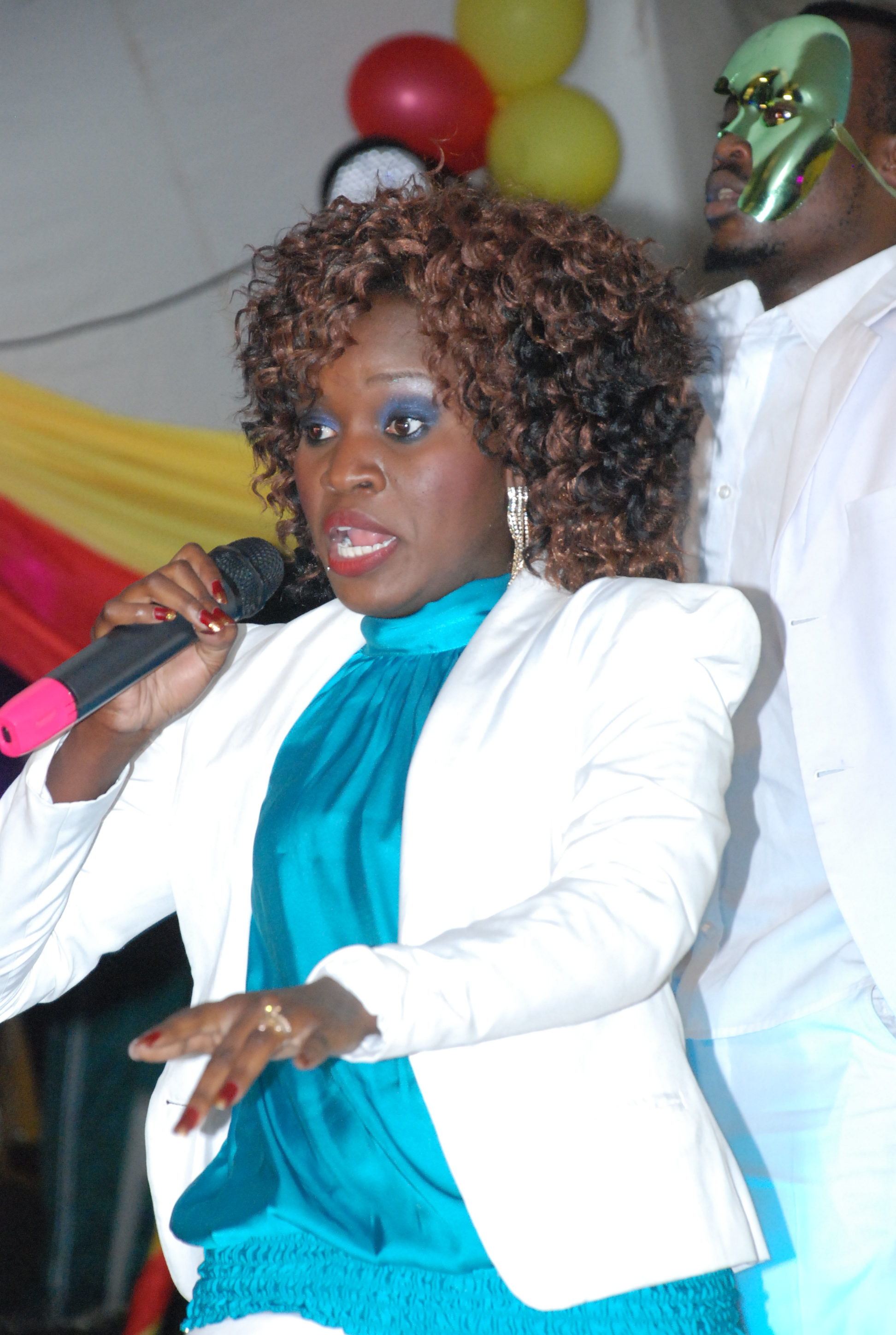
- Born: Jackie Chandiru Eyaa; 13 September 1984 (age 42); Nsambya, Uganda
- Citizenship: Uganda
- Education: Makerere University (BA in Industrial Fine Art)
- Occupations: Choreographer, Industrial Artiste, MakeUp Artiste, Entertainer & Song Writer.
- Years active: 2003 – present
- Known for: Musician
- Musical career
- Genres: Pop; R&B; Dancehall; Afrobeat
- Years active: 2003–present
- Labels: BM Publications, Fenon events, Talent Africa International, M-Tech, Kenya

Jackie Chandiru (born on 13 September 1984) is a Ugandan musician. She is commonly known by the polynym "Queen Of The Nile." She was the lead member of the girl music group the Blu*3. In 2014, she was a featured artist in Coke Studio Africa.

== Early life ==
Jackie was born at Nsambya Hospital on 13 September 1984 to Felix Eyaa and Josephine Eyaa. Her father traces his ancestry to Kijomoro Village in the present-day Maracha District. Her mother, Josephine Eyaa, is a Muganda from Buganda and has previously lived in London, United Kingdom.

== Education background ==
Jackie Chandiru attended Lugogo Nursery School and Nakasero Primary School for her elementary schooling. She studied at Nabisunsa Girls' Secondary School for her O-Level studies and at Vienna College International, a private, boarding school in Kira Municipality. She studied Industrial Fine Art at Makerere University, graduating with a Bachelor of Arts in Industrial Fine Art.

Earlier, while in primary school, Chandiru was an athlete, goalkeeper and captain of the school football team. While at Nabisunsa, she was the president of the school's drama club and a member of the school's under-16 badminton team.

== Career ==
In 2002, at 18, Jackie Chandiru joined the Coca-Cola Pop Star Competition on a whim. She was surprised when she won the competition, along with Lilian Mbabazi and Cindy Sanyu. Jackie Chandiru wrote melodies for Hitajji and Bad Gal while at university. The three of them formed the music trio known as Blu*3. She found musical success with the group winning the Best Artist/Group from Uganda & Best Music Video from Uganda in the 2005 Kisima Music Awards, Video of the Year ("Hitaji") in the 2005 Pearl of Africa Music Awards. In 2007, she won in the Video of the Year category with "Burrn" at the Pearl of Africa Music Awards. In 2005, Blue*3 was nominated for best East African Group in the 2005 Kora Awards. Best East African Album (Hitaji) in the 2005 Tanzania Music Awards. In 2006, Blue*3 was nominated for the Best East African video ("Frisky") in 2006. In 2009, they were nominated for Best Group & Best Performer in the 2009 MTV Africa Music Awards and for the Best East African Song (Where You Are with Radio & Weasel) in the 2010 Tanzania music awards.

In 2008, after five years of working together, one of the founding members of Blu*3, Cinderella Sanyu, suddenly left the group to launch a solo career. The remaining two group founders, Jackie Chandiru and Lilian Mbabazi, recruited a new singer, Mya Baganda, and changed the group's name to Blu 3 without the asterisk.

In 2010, Jackie embarked on a solo career. In mid-2010, Jackie released her first single, "Agassi" in Lugbara (her native language) and English. This song earned her recognition as a solo artist and an award for Best RnB single in the Diva Awards. It won the Video of the Year award in the Pearl of Africa Music Awards 2011. She released several hit songs, including "Gwoyagala," "Overdose," "For all time," "Bakusigula," "'Don't Call His Phone," "Gold Digger" and "Agassi." She has collaborated with "Sami" Ezra from Eritrea, Jose Chameleon and rapper Navio, "Urban Boys." She released her first album, "To Live or Die," in 2010 with songs in Lugbara and English.

In October 2014, Jackie Chandiru performed at Pearl Rhythm Festival at the Uganda National Theatre alongside mostly live performers, The Magic Horns, Caesar Kajura and the city blend band, Undercover Brothers Ug, Arpeggio, Charles Obina and Matata, Kabwondera Junior Raymod Parwot, and Watmon Troupe.

On 17 April 2015, Jackie Chandiru appeared at her Wotuuse music video premiere at Club Ambiance in Kampala in partnership with NBS TV and Tusker Lite. In attendance were Jackie’s family, Bryan Morel (publicist), Peter Naawe (who wrote the song), Director 1488 (who shot and directed the video) and revellers who danced to the live performance of her songs Ikumabo, Irringwa, Gold Digger, For All Time (Featuring Sami Ezra), Wotuuse, Bad Gal (featuring Blu*3) and Omukwano.

After a five-year break, Jackie launched a comeback and released two songs, "Mi Ora Ku" and "Whine It," featuring Jose Chameleon and is doing well based on updates by BM Publications from Nairobi, Kenya.

== Discography ==
See more of Jackie Chandiru's songs, albums, awards and nominations at Blu*3

Songs

- "Agassi"
- "Wotuuse"
- "Overdose"
- "Break My Heart" (featuring Coco Finger)
- "Champion"
- "With Me"
- "Mungu Ni Mabe"
- "Ikumabo"
- "Afii"
- "Obulungi Buli Mumutima"
- "Bakusigula"
- "Breathe Na Na Na" (featuring Mun G)
- "Don't Call His Phone"
- "Ladies Night" (featuring Coco Finger, Ronnie Banton, DJ Shiru and AK47)
- "Kwaheri"
- "Analigo Tai (Kalas)"
- "Ngenze Noono" Iryn Namubiru Reindition
- "Gwoyagala" (featuring Rabadaba)
- "Gold digger"
- "Shamim"
- "Malkia" (featuring Syd)
- "Gwoka"
- "Chimalo" (featuring Zani Lady C and Flip Tyce)
- "Walaga"
- "Whine It" (featuring Jose Chameleon)
- "Walaga" (featuring Mr. Lengz)
- "Tower Of Strength" (featuring Cindy Sanyu and Lilian Mbabazi
- "Mi Ora Ku"
- "Woah" (featuring Blu*3
- "To Live And To Die"
- "Thank You" (featuring Dj Benny D)
- "Dirty Shame" (featuring Batabazi Underground)
- "Diamond" Rihanna Dub
- "Gold Digger" Mornay MIX
- "Better Than Them" (featuring Beenie Man and Jose Chameleon
- "Voom Voom" (featuring A-Boy and Cindy Sanyu
- "Nafuunye"
- "Young Again"
- "Omukwano"
- "The One" (featuring Arrow Boy)
- "Nitakufinya" (featuring Kelechi Africana)
- "P'aloke"
- "Singa Nali Musajja"
- "Quarantine"
- "Ntijisa" (featuring Mesech Ssemakula)
- "Love Enzita"
- "Goin On" (featuring Dr. Jose Chameleon)
- "Wind It Up" (featuring Navio and Fidempa)
- "Salawo Salawo"
- "One Time Lover" (featuring AK47)
- "I Belong To You"
- "Take Me Higher" (featuring Waje and Isis)
- "Drile Imu"
- "Real Love" (featuring Vampino)
- "Take It Off" (featuring Urban Boyz)

Albums

- Hitajji 2004
- Burrn 2007
- Be Free 2009
- To Live and To die 2010

== Awards and recognition ==
- Video of the Year in Pearl of Africa Music Awards 2011 for "Agassi".
- Best RnB Single in Diva awards for "Agassi"
