= Josephine Namakumbi =

Ugandan news anchor and reporter

- Born: Josephine Namakumbi
- Occupations: Journalist; Television presenter; Media executive
- Years active: 2018–present
- Employer: NBS Television
- Known for: News presentation and journalism
- Notable work: Amasegenjje

Josephine Namakumbi is a Ugandan professional journalist, news anchor and reporter. She has worked with NBS Television, a Ugandan television broadcaster operated by Next Media Services. She has reported on politics, current affairs and other national issues in Uganda.

== Career ==
=== NBS Television ===
Namakumbi worked as a journalist and news reporter at NBS Television from 2018. Her reporting covered political developments and public affairs in Uganda. One of her published reports, Can alliances resolve political divisions?, examined the role of political alliances in addressing divisions in Uganda's political landscape.

She also presented news programming in Luganda, including the bulletin Amasegenjje, during her time at NBS Television. In 2026, she departed ways with the station after eight years of service.

== Assault ==
On 17 February 2021, Namakumbi was among several Ugandan journalists assaulted by military police officers while covering an event involving opposition politician Robert Kyagulanyi at the United Nations Human Rights offices in Kololo, Kampala.

The journalists had gathered to cover Kyagulanyi's presentation of a petition concerning human rights violations by the current ruling governmennt of Uganda. Security personnel reportedly chased and assaulted journalists who were attempting to cover the event. Namakumbi was among those who sustained injuries during the incident.

On 3 March 2021, Namakumbi and three other journalists filed a lawsuit against the Ugandan government and a military officer at the High Court in Kampala. The journalists sought legal recognition of the violation of their rights to freedom of expression and freedom of the press under the Constitution of Uganda.

The incident attracted attention from organisations concerned with press freedom and the protection of journalists in Uganda.

== See also ==
- Canary Mugume
- Samson Kasumba
- Solomon Serwanjja
- Mildred Amooti Tuhaise
