= Blu*3 =

Ugandan girl group

- Origin: Kampala, Uganda
- Genres: Soft rock; pop; R&B; indie pop; rock
- Years active: 2004–2010
- Members: Lilian Mbabazi; Jackie Chandiru; Cinderella Sanyu; Mya Baganda

Blu 3 was a Ugandan girl group formed in April 2004 after winning the TV show Coca Cola Popstars. The name is contrived to mean 3 Beautiful (or Black) Ladies from Uganda. Original members were Jackie Chandiru, Lilian Mbabazi and Cinderella Sanyu. After winning the contest, they went on to record the albums Hitaji (2004) and Burrn (2007). The Hitaji album spawned the hit singles "Hitaji", "Frisky" and the afro beat "Tomalaako". The girls launched Hitaji at lugogo cricket stadium in December 2004 with thousands of fans. The "Hitaji" video went on to win the Pearl of Africa Music Award for Video of the Year.

Apparently, Sanyu left to pursue other projects and was replaced by Mya Baganda. The group's name was changed to Blu 3 having dropped the star.

In 2006 Blu 3 got back in the studio with their longtime producer and manager Steve Jean and recorded the full-length album Burrn. The title track featured Navio from hip hop group Klear Kut. Other hits on the album were the Sylver Kyagulanyi penned songs "Nsanyuka Nawe", "Ndibeera Nawe" and "Nkoye". "Burrn" won the Video of the Year award at the 2006 Pearl of Africa Music Awards (PAM Awards). They have also been nominated for Kora Awards, Channel O Music Video Awards and have won two Kisima Awards, three PAM Awards and numerous others. The group has toured many countries including Kenya, Rwanda, Tanzania, South Africa, Ghana, Nigeria, UK and Ethiopia. A new album had been planned for late 2008 with a slew of international producers like Charlie King and Aydee of Goodenuff coming in on the project. The working title of the project is B3 and is expected to wrap production in October 2009. The first single off the new album is the Latin flavored "Together" produced by Steve Jean.

In 2023, the original three members of the trio reunited and staged a concert "The Legends of Sound" at the Sheraton hotel gardens in Kampala on 22nd June, 2024 in partnership with Talent Africa Group.

== Awards ==
=== Won ===
- 2005 Kisima Music Awards — Best Artist/Group from Uganda & Best Music Video from Uganda
- 2005 Pearl of Africa Music Awards — Video of the Year ("Hitaji")
- 2007 Pearl of Africa Music Awards — Video of the Year ("Burrn")

=== Nominations ===
- 2005 Kora Awards — Best East African Group
- 2005 Tanzania Music Awards — Best East African Album (Hitaji)
- 2006 Channel O Music Video Awards — Best East African video ("Frisky")
- 2009 MTV Africa Music Awards — Best Group & Best Performer
- 2010 Tanzania music awards — Best East African Song ('Where you are' with Radio & Weasel).

== See also ==
- B2C Entertainment
- Goodlyfe Crew
