= Kwizera =

Kwizera is both a given name and a surname. Notable people with the name include:

- Kwizera Arnold (born 1993), Rwandan journalist
- Kwizera Eudia, Ugandan politician
- Arthur Kwizera, Ugandan anesthesiologist
- Dieudonné Kwizera (born 1967), Burundian runner
- Jojea Kwizera (born 1999), Rwandan footballer
- Olivier Kwizera (born 1995), Rwandan footballer
- Pierre Kwizera (born 1991), Burundian footballer
- Rodrigue Kwizera (born 1999), Burundian runner
