= Laika Umuhoza =

Laika Umuhoza is an Ugandan musician also known by her stage name Laika. She is a songwriter vocalist and live performer who records her albums on tracks like afro-zouk afro-pop, afro-RnB type of music. Laika grew up in Munyonyo, a surburb of Kampala but was born in Kanungu district in western Uganda. Her music career has been inspired by people like Alicia Keys, Lauryn Hill and Beyonce including Ugandan artists like Lilian Mbabazi.

== Early life and education ==
Laika Umuhoza started her music career after graduating from the United States University of Virginia's College at Wise in 2019 with a bachelor's degree in accounting. In 2020, she released her debut hit song "My type" and subsequent albums followed like overdose, Netwalira, your body, love story, You single and Nzuuno. Her songs are enjoyed by both fans and her producers.

== Personal life ==
Laika Umuhoza stated that she intends to marry and have a family in her early 30s.

== See also ==
- Sheeba Karungi
- Irene Ntale
