= Joseph Oyet =

- Born: Joseph Oyet; February 2, 1996 (age 30) Mulago Hospital, Kampala, Uganda
- School: Mbuya Primary School
- University: Kololo Senior Secondary School
- Occupation(s): Rugby player, coach, mentor

Rugby union career
- Position: Fullback
- Current team: Hima Cement Heathens
Youth career
- -: Kyadondo Totos
Senior career
Years	Team	Apps	(Points)
2013–2018; 2019–present	Heathens RFC		
2018–2019	9 Barrels Warriors		
International career
Years	Team	Apps	(Points)
2013–2014	Uganda U-19		
–	Uganda (Rugby Cranes)		

Joseph Oyet, popularly known as "Ojoo" is a notable figure in Ugandan rugby, recognized for his contributions both as a player and a coach. Currently playing as a fullback for Hima Heathens, one of Uganda's premier rugby clubs, Oyet has also represented the national team, the Rugby Cranes.

== Early life and education ==
Oyet was born on February 2, 1996, at Mulago Hospital in Kampala, Uganda, to Eromina Ayero and Faustino Okello. His family originates from Acholibur, a town in the Pader District of northern Uganda, though he spent his childhood in Kampala. Oyet is the youngest of seven children and often credits his late father, who passed away in March 2019, for encouraging his early involvement in sports.

Oyet's interest in rugby began at the age of six in 2004 when he visited Kyadondo Rugby Club with friends, where he started as a ball boy and water career. He became actively involved in the sport through Tag rugby Trust's youth program, participating in age-grade competitions and representing Mbuya Primary School and Kyadondo Totos.

He later joined Kololo Senior Secondary School where he continued to develop his rugby skills while balancing hi academic studies.

== Career and notable moments ==
Oyet began his playing career with junior sides such as Tigers and Stallions, both based at Kyadondo. He joined Heathens in 2013 and remained with the club until 2018, before transferring to 9 Barrels warriors for 2018-2019 season. He returned to Hima Cement Heathens, where he continues to play.

In the 2024 season, he recorded 87 points, consisting of 8 tries, 3 penalties and 19 conversions. His contributions have been part of Heathens' ongoing domestic success.

Internationally, Oyet has represented Uganda at the Under-19 level, participating in the following tournaments:

- Tier 1C Championship (kyadondo, 2013), Uganda earned promotion to Tier B
- Tier 1B Tournament (Tunisia, 2013)
- U-19 Elgon Cup (Uganda vs Kenya)
- Safari 7s (Kyadondo Select, 2014)

Besides playing rugby, Oyet also plays cricket and represented Aziz Damani in the Uganda national Cricket League.

== Achievements ==
Oyet's rugby achievements include:

- 4 National League Titles with Heathens.
- 2 Uganda Cup Titles.
- Promotion to Tier 1B with Uganda u-19 (2013).

Among his most notable performances was the 2019 Uganda Cup semifinal, in which he scored the only try in a match between Heathens and Black Pirates.

== Community involvement ==
In addition to his playing career, Oyet is actively involved in community development. Drawing from his own experiences, he founded a rugby academy to train and mentor young players, particularly those from underprivileged backgrounds. His efforts aim to provide structured opportunities for youth engagement through sport.

Although his plans to play in Canada were initially disrupted by the COVID-19 pandemic, Oyet continued to focus on local development. His academy remains dedicated to offering access to rugby training, mentoring and broader opportunities for aspiring players in his community.
