= Elizabeth Ntege =

Ugandan engineer, entrepreneur, innovator, educator

- Citizenship: British & Ugandan
- Education: Bachelor of Engineering (BEng) Electronics (Control Systems & Computer Engineering), Executive Diploma in Management.
- Alma mater: De Montfort University Leicester (DMU), Chartered Management Institute
- Occupations: Engineer, Faith-driven Entrepreneur, Innovator, Educator
- Title: Founder and CEO of NFT Consult Group
- Awards: Tech She-Roe 2025

Elizabeth Ntege is an engineer, faith-driven entrepreneur, innovator, educator, and advocate for digital transformation across Africa. She is the Board Chairperson of Information Communication Technology Association Uganda (ICTAU), Co-Founder and CEO of NFT Group starting January 2020, Which includes NFT Consult, NFT Mobility, NFT Ignite which operates in six East African countries and served as non-Executive Member Board of Stanbic Bank Uganda.

She worked as an engineer for companies like Uganda Telecom, British Telecom, BT Concert and D-link Europe.

== Education ==
Elizabeth obtained a Bachelor of Engineering (BEng) Electronics, Systems Engineering (1989–1993) at De Montfort University Leicester (DMU) and an Executive Diploma in Management at Chartered Management Institute (2006).

== Career ==
Elizabeth worked with Uganda Telecom, British Telecom, BT Concert, and D-Link Europe as an engineer for over 10 years and as an Integrator and Business Advisor at The Innovation Village from Feb 2020 to Oct 2020.

She is a co-founder NFT Consult Group which begun in 2005 till today with its operations across 12 countries in East Africa and South Africa, CEO at NFT Consult Ltd, starting January 2021 to present as well as the director Strategy and Operations from Mar 2005 - Dec 2019, she was elected in February 2021 to present board chair of Information Communication Technology Association Uganda (ICTAU), and Chairperson on the board of Data Care Uganda Limited and board of Chance for Childhood, a UK-based non profit organization supporting vulnerable children since June 2020. She is the Co-founder ITES Innovation Hub and Chairperson - Board Technology and Innovations, November 2023- May 2024 Non-Executive Director at Stanbic Bank Uganda since January 2020 to May 2024. She is also a Digital Transform and HR at Invest2Impact Africa since May 2020.

In her career, she focuses on the Oil and Gas, Finance, IT, and Telecom industries.

== Award and achievements ==
- Tech She-Roe 2025.
- Signatory Women's Empowerment Principles June 2024.
- Gold Award - UNDP Gender Equality Seal in December 2023.

== Personal life ==
She is married with two daughters.

== See also ==
- Maggie Kigozi
