= Tuhaise =

Tuhaise is a surname. Notable people with the surname include:

- Mildred Tuhaise (born 1990), Ugandan news anchor
- Percy Tuhaise (born 1960), Ugandan lawyer and judge
