= Daniel Lutaaya =

Ugandan journalist

Daniel Lutaaya is a Ugandan investigative journalist known for his work in and online media. He is the founder and CEO of News 24/7, Uganda's first 24-hour online multi news platform. His career spans various roles, including senior investigative journalist and news anchor.

== Career ==
Lutaaya began his journalism career at Joy FM, later transitioning to Life TV and Galaxy FM. He gained experience at WBS Television, where he worked as a news anchor and morning show for over three years. He left NBS in June 2022. After WBS closure, he moved to Kwese TV as a sports journalist before joining NBS Television in 2018. At NBS, he became a senior journalist, covering high-profile stories and producing investigative reports. He left the station in 2022, following his final assignment at the Commonwealth Heads of Government Meeting in Rwanda.

== Awards ==
Lutaaya is a three-time winner of Uganda's national journalism awards for excellence in investigative reporting, health reporting and extractive industries reporting.

He is also a fellow of the Thomson Reuters Foundation, BBC and Voice of America and has received training from the Institute for the Advancement of Journalism. His investigative work has influenced policy debates and reforms in Uganda.

== News 24/7 ==
Lutaaya is the founder and Managing Director of News 24/7, a pioneering first-digital news organization in Uganda. Established to provide high-quality investigative journalism, the platform has gained recognition for its innovative approaches to storytelling and audience management. Under his leadership, News 24/7 has become a trusted source of news, earning the inaugural Newsroom and Editorial Transformation Award in 2024.
