= Cindy Sanyu =

Ugandan musician (born 1985)

Cinderella Sanyu
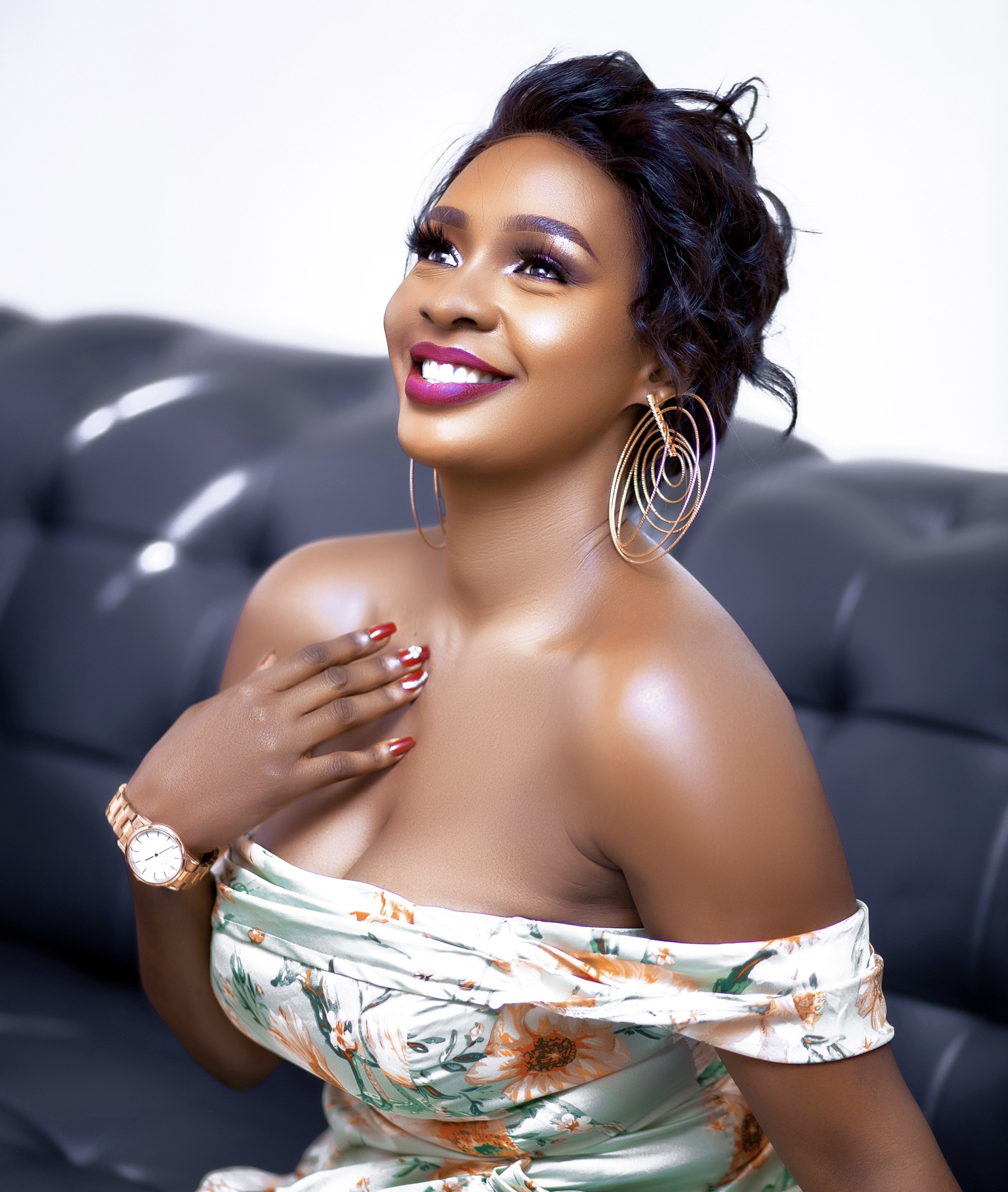
- Born: August 28, 1985 (age 41); Kampala, Uganda
- Occupation: Musician
- Partner(s): Mario Brunetti (2007-2016); Ken Muyiisa (2017-2018); Okuyo Joel Atiku Prynce(2021–present)
- Musical career
- Genres: Dancehall; Pop; R&B; Afrobeat
- Years active: 2003–present
- Label: Star Maker ltd
- Formerly of: Blu*3
- Website: www.cindysanyu.com

Cinderella Sanyu (born 28 August 1985) professionally known as Cindy or Cindy Sanyu is a Ugandan musician. She was one of the original members of Blu*3, along with Lilian Mbabazi and Jackie Chandiru.

She has performed with P-Square, Wahu, Beenie Man, Ne-Yo, Tiwa savage, Bobi Wine, Shaggy, Chameleon, Bebe Cool, Davido, Mr. G and Radio & Weasel.

== Early life and education ==
Cindy was born on 28 August 1985 in Kampala, Uganda, but hails from Serere district.

== Music ==
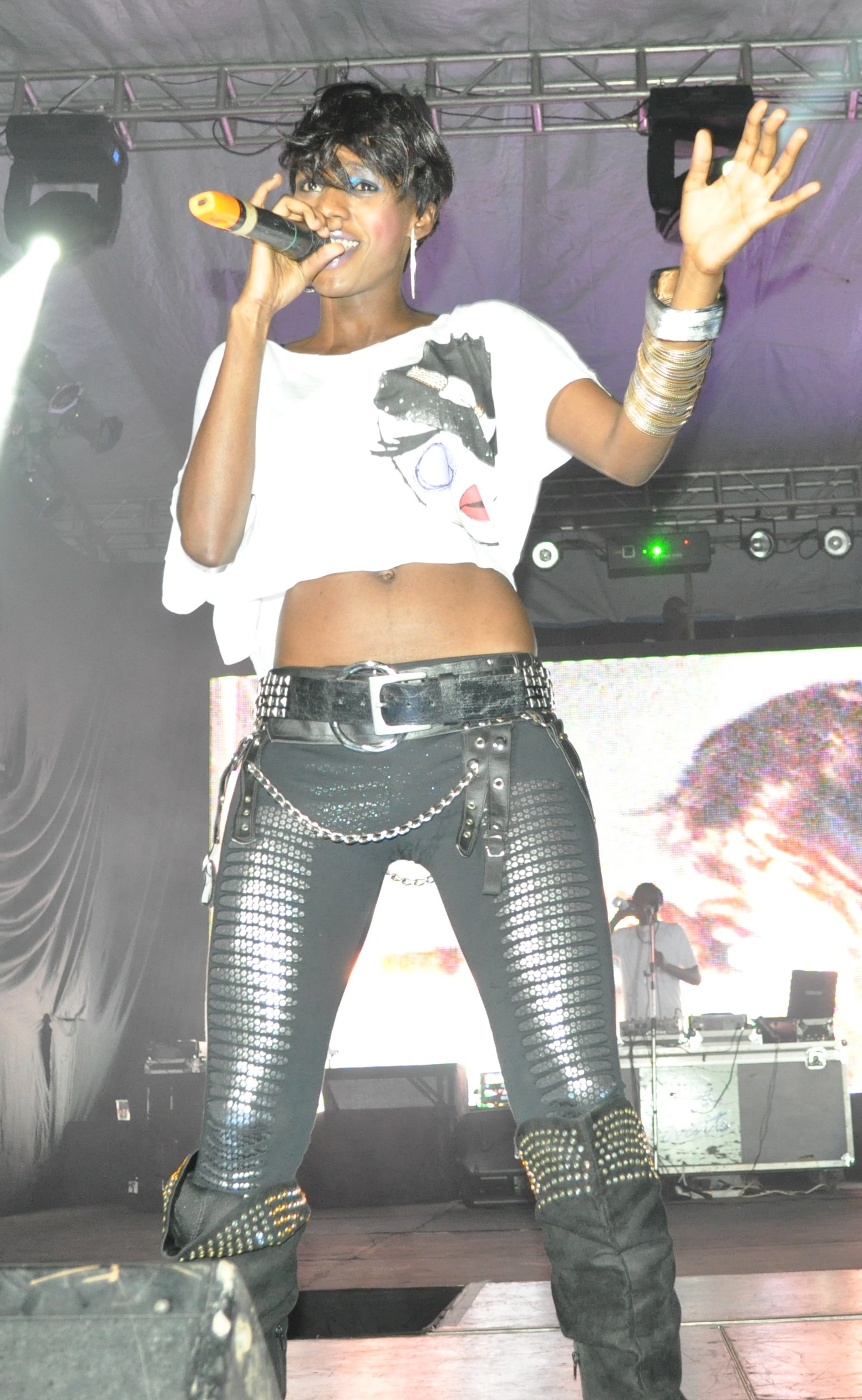
Cindy Sanyu performing in 2011

Cindy started singing when she was 6 in her local church at a small town called Ntinda. She took part in "Capital Radio All Stars talent search" when she was 16 years old. She took third place. She worked with producer Steve Jean who made sure she participated in the "Coca-Cola Pop Stars" contest, which led to the formation of Blu*3 in 2003. With Blu*3, Cindy found music success winning the Best Artist/Group from Uganda & Best Music Video from Uganda in the 2005 Kisima Music Awards, Video of the Year ("Hitaji") in the 2005 Pearl of Africa Music Awards and Video of the Year ("Burrn") in the 2007 Pearl of Africa Music Awards and being nominated for best East African Group in the 2005 Kora Awards, Best East African Album (Hitaji) in the 2005 Tanzania Music Awards Best East African Video ("Frisky") in the 2006 Channel O Music Video Awards, Best Group & Best Performer in the 2009 MTV Africa Music Awards and Best East African Song ('Where you are' with Radio & Weasel) in the 2010 Tanzania music awards.

Cindy was dropped from the group. In 2008, she embarked on a solo career. Her debu solo album Ayokyayokya (2009) topped charts all over East Africa with hits like "Mbikooye" and "Nawewe", "Ayokyayokya", and "One and Only". She has had more successful songs, like "Selekta".

== Acting ==
Cindy got her debut film acting role as the lead in the Ugandan musical drama film Bella. Her performance earned her nominations at the Africa Movie Academy Awards for Best Young Actor, Africa Lead Role In Film (Non Nigerian) at the Nigeria Entertainment Awards and Best Actress at Uganda Film Festival Awards, all in 2018.

She later worked on the film November Tear, released in 2019.

== Personal life ==
Cinderella Sanyu was in a relationship with Mario Brunetti and the relationship produced a daughter, Amani. She got engaged to actor, producer and film director Joel Okuyo Prynce in March 2020 in Kampala. She married Joel Okuyo Prynce on 11 December 2021. She had a child with him.

== Leadership roles ==
Cindy is currently the Acting President of the Uganda Musicians' Association (UMA) after the resignation Ykee Benda as his deputy, Cindy stepped forward and filled the president’s shoes.

== Controversy ==
Cinderella Sanyu was involved in a relationship with Ken Muyisa.

On leaving Blu*3, her fellow band members Jackie Chandiru and Lillian Mbabazi claimed that "she was not candid" about her reasons for leaving. It was not long until Cindy embarked on a solo career with her hit single "Mbikooye" and wrote more hits like "Ayokyayokya", "Amateeka", "Party", "Selecta", "Ndi mukodo", and "Run this city".

== Discography ==
=== Songs ===
- Mbikooye
- Amateeka
- One and only
- Party
- Total satisfaction
- Nawewe
- Selekta
- Tempo remix
- Ndi mukodo
- Samodat
- Dat dat
- Run this city
- One by one ft Skales
- Dancehall ft Eddy Kenzo
- Onnina
- Faded
- Copicat
- Boom party
- Scream ft. Ak47 Mayanja
- See You Tonight ft Omega 256

=== Albums ===
- The King Herself, 2019
- Ayokyayokya, 2009

== Awards and recognition ==
- Female artiste of the year in the DIVA awards, 2009
- Teenies' dancehall artiste in Buzz teenies awards, 2010
- Best female artiste of the year in Buzz teenies awards, 2010
- Afrima awards best female artiste (East Africa) 2016
- Bingwa awards best artiste from Uganda 2016
