= Tanke =

Neighbourhood in Ilorin, Nigeria

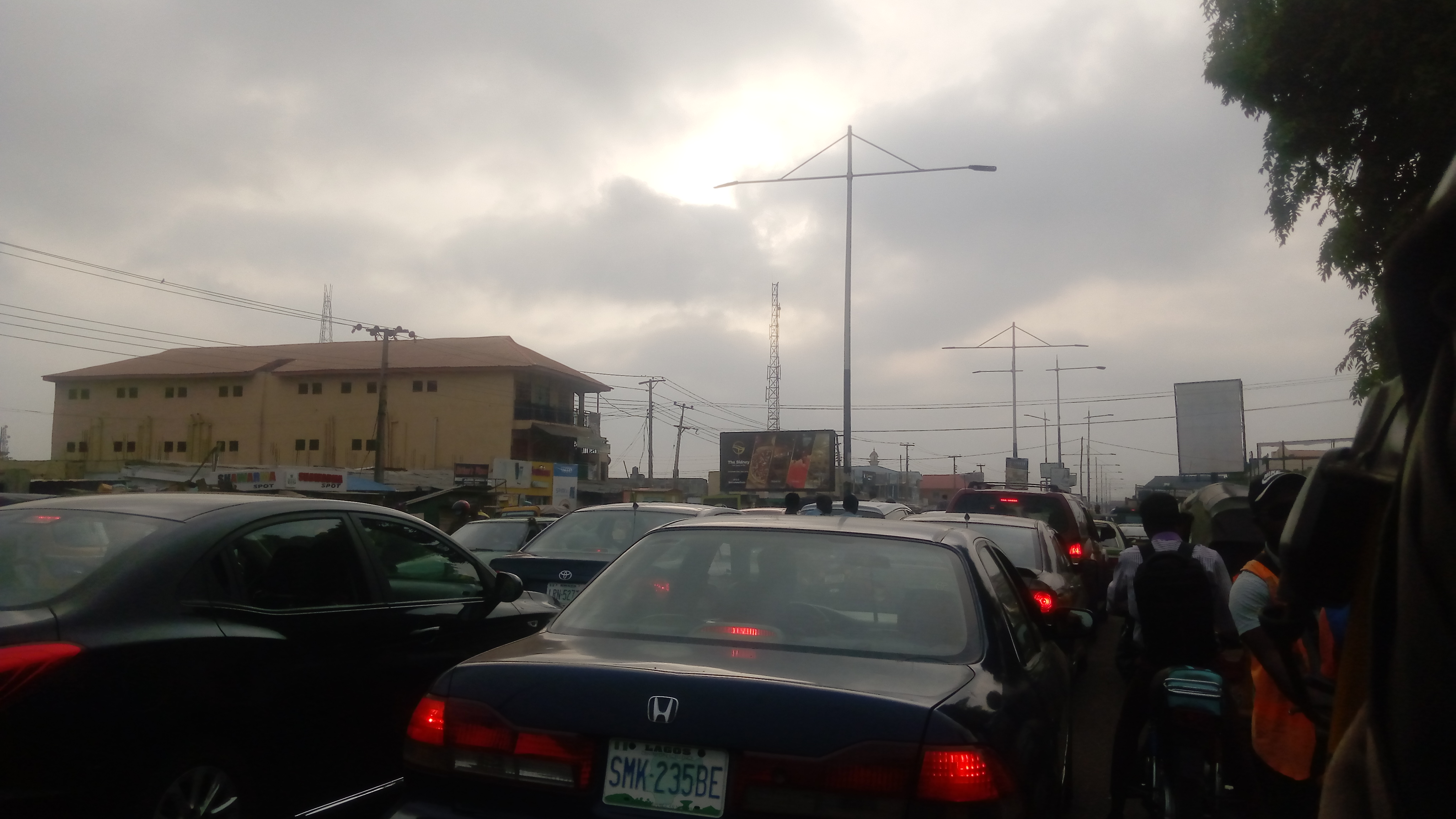
Traffic Jam in Tanke Ilorin

Tanke is a community in the city of Ilorin, which is the capital of Kwara State, Nigeria.

Tanke is located at Ilorin South. It is a residential area of University Road, in the city of Ilorin. The community is a settlement that is mostly occupied by students of the University of Ilorin. The area houses places such as the Tanke Market, Tanke Reservoir, Royal FM. Kaynet street in Tanke Ilorin after visiting Avenue.

== Oke Odo Market ==
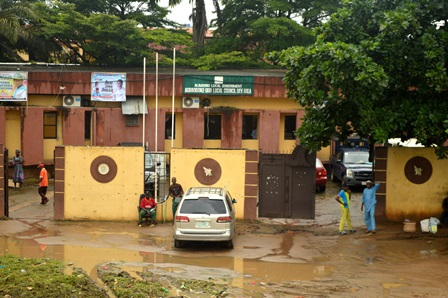
A picture of Oke Odo Local Council in Agbado

Oke-Ode Market is located off the campus of the University of Ìlọrin, a few kilometers from the University Gate. It is not a popular market in the city of Ìlọrin due to its seasonal patronage, but often, it is a major market for residents. The Oke-Ode community in Ìlọrin South is populated with students of the aforementioned institution.

Petty traders are few and they majorly trade on Tomatoes, Peppers, Vegetables, Onions, Garri, and other grain farm produce.
