= Coke Studio Africa =

African Music Series

- Based on: Coke Studio
- Countries of origin: South Africa, Nigeria, Kenya, Egypt, Uganda, Rwanda, Togo

Production
- Executive producers: David Sanders (Season 2); Deana Heslop-Mthembu (Season 4, and Season 7); Matthew Gray (Season 6)
- Camera setup: Multi-camera
- Running time: 45 minutes
- Production company: Mashoba Media; Good Noise Productions; Coca-Cola Production

Original release
- Network: Maisha Magic Plus; Citizen TV; KISS TV; K24 TV; ST Swahili; KTN; NTV; Switch TV Kenya; Zambezi Magic; QTV Kenya; Urban TV Uganda; e.tv
- Release: 7 October 2013 – present

Coke Studio Africa is an African music television series that features live musical performances by various artists, recorded in the studio, in classical musical genres of Africa such as Afrobeats, Afro-pop, Kwaito, Jùjú, Gqom, Mbaqanga, Palm-wine, Coupé-décalé, Chimurenga, Salegy, Bantu, Benga, Malipenga, Baka, Bongo Flava, Highlife, Afro House, Makossa, Kwela, Azonto, Kuduro, Afro-soul, Blues, Funk, South African Jazz, East African urban music, Isicathamiya, Hiplife, Congolese rumba, ndombolo, Mbube, Township, Afro, Soca, Jaiva, Marabi, Taarab, Cumbia, as well as Soul, R&B, and pop music. The program's concept was adapted from Coke Studio Pakistan.

== History ==
In October 2013, Coke Studio Africa, the African version of the show, was launched with Good Noise Productions, producing the first season and introducing multiple executive producers later on the show. David Sanders served as the executive producer of the second season. Deana Heslop-Mthembu served as the executive producer of the fourth and seventh seasons, and Matthew Gray produced the sixth season.

As of August 2017, the show had reached 30 countries across East, Central, and Southern Africa with an estimated audience of half a billion viewers. In South Africa alone, the show averaged 958,600 weekly viewers. As of November 2018, the show had aired on 27 local stations and generated 400 million radio impressions across 14 African countries. In 2023, Coke Studio Africa partnered with DStv Delicious International Food and Music Festival to produce a live event.

== Featured artists ==
=== 2023 Season ===
- BNXN with Young Stunna, and Nikita Kering - "Traboski"

== Production ==
=== Filming ===
The series was fimed in locations including South Africa, Nigeria, Kenya, Egypt, Uganda, Rwanda, and Togo. On 7 December 2015, the third season of the show was listed among the best TV shows of the year in Kenya.

== Broadcast history ==
On 4 October 2013, Coca-Cola held private screening of Coke Studio Africa at Genesis Deluxe Cinemas in Lagos, Nigeria. On 8 October 2013, the show began broadcasting on NTV, and QTV Kenya. On 11 October 2015, Citizen TV began broadcasting the show. On 8 October 2016, Urban TV Uganda began broadcasting the show. On 5 December 2016, it began broadcasting on Maisha Magic Plus. On 12 August 2017, the show debuted on e.tv. On 28 August 2017, the program began broadcasting on Zambezi Magic. On 15 February 2019, the show began broadcasting on Kiss TV, K24 TV, KTN, Switch TV Kenya, and ST Swahili. On the same day, the program began airing on radio stations including Radio Citizen, Radio Maisha, Milele FM, Nation FM, and NRG Radio.
