= Joanita Zachariassen =

- Genres: Afrobeat

Joanita Lubegga Zachariassen is a Ugandan Afrobeat and Afropop musician. She started her music career in Denmark and later relocated to Uganda.

== Career ==
Zachariassen sings in both English and Luganda.

Zachariassen began her career after performing in the 2009 edition of Denmark's Got Talent.

Zachariassen won the DR Live 2018 singing competition, a Danish talent show, for which she received 250,000DKr. That year, she was also named a judge on the Danish series All Together Now.

She returned to Uganda in 2025. She plans to release her next album in 2026.

== Discography ==
=== Albums ===
- Party after Party (2025)

=== Singles ===
- "Party after Party" (2025)

== Personal life ==
Zachariassen has been married for 12 years with one son.

== See also ==
- Lillian Mbabazi
- Sheeba Karungi
