= Samson Kasumba =

Show host

- Born: 1974 (age 51–52); Kampala
- Education: Bachelor of Theology, theology (Bugema University) and University of Wales, master's degree in theology
- Occupations: News anchor, pastor and show host
- Known for: News anchor at NBS Television
- Parent: Fenekansi Kasumba

Samson Kasumba (born 1974) is a Ugandan pastor, news anchor and show host. He works with NBS Television.

== Early life and education ==
Kasumba was born in 1974 to Fenekansi Kasumba Muwanga and Justine Nabacwa Kasumba Muwanga. He attended Clock tower nursery school, Police nursery school in Nsambya barracks, and Jack and Jill nursery school for his nursery education. He then went to Kireka SDA Primary School before being transferred and completing his primary education from Nakasero Primary School. He moved to Kyambogo College School for his Uganda Certificate of Education, then went on to Kololo High School for his Uganda Advanced Certificate of Education.

He then enrolled for a diploma in commercial industrial fine art and design at Nkumba University. He later returned to the same university for his degree which he abandoned to pursue a bachelor's degree in theology at Bugema University. However, while at Bugema the DVC academics at the university identified his abilities and keen interest in Biblical languages (Greek and Hebrew), forcing him to change his course from pastoring churches, opening him to a new path in academia. This is how he was linked to an African Students' Scholarship fund to pursue a master's degree at University of Wales Lampeter. His supervisor for the master's degree thesis pressed Kasumba to continue into a PhD; however, he was thwarted by finances. He was forced to return to the country to lecture theology at Bugema University. He was later stopped after he was defrocked due to his views that were divergent from those of his Seventh Day Adventist faith.

== Career ==
He began work in 1996 straight out of university to join Selected Reminiscences of Yoweri Museveni, a quarterly magazine. He moved into private business, operating along both Nasser Road and Johnson Street. He worked briefly and concurrently at both Jeremy Car Wash as manager, and Monitor FM as its Gospel Show host. He worked as a lecturer at Bugema University and also volunteered with the Interreligious Council of Uganda before returning to the same organization as its head of communications. He was working with Urban TV Uganda before he joined NBS Television in 2016. He was also part of Topowa Campaign by CCEDU, a human rights advocacy team sensitizing people during the 2016 general elections.

== Personal life ==
He has been married for 14 years with four daughters, one of them adopted.

== Notable events ==
He was arrested for allegedly undermining government measures to curb the spread of COVID-19 in April, 2020.

In November, 2021, he survived a serious road accident.

== See also ==
- Milton Allimadi
- Ndyakira Amooti
- Evelyn Anite
- Catherine Apalat
- Adonia Ayebare
- Joy Doreen Biira
- Bulasio Mukasa
- Carol Alyek Beyanga
- Monica Chibita
