= Rukh-Shana Namuyimba =

Ugandan journalist (born 1978)

- Born: 1978 (age 47–48); Kampala, Uganda
- Occupation: Journalism
- Known for: The News Anchor

Rukh-Shana Namuyimba is a Ugandan communications specialist. She is a news anchor, and a co-founder of Xfinity Communications Ltd. She initially worked as news anchor at NTV Uganda, before moving to NBS Television.

== Early life and education ==
Rukh-Shana (born October 17, 1978, in Kampala) is the daughter of retired Major Al Hajji Badru Namuyimba, who served as a fighter pilot in the air force during Idi Amin's regime, and Hajat Jannet Namuyimba, a retired civil servant. Her family fled to exile in Nairobi, Kenya, just a few months after she was born. They lived in Nairobi until she was 10 years old. Upon return to Uganda in 1988, she joined Bwala Muslim Boarding Primary School in Masaka. She attended King's College Budo from 1991 to 1996 for O' and A' Level.

She later joined Makerere University in 1997 to 2000, where she acquired a Bachelor of Arts (BA), communication (major), literature and English language (minor). in 1997.

== Career ==
Rukh-Shana began her career in the media as a voice-over talent and radio news anchor at Capital FM in 1999. She then moved on to Monitor FM (now 933 KFM) in 2002 as a Current News and Radio features reporter. Her knack for news and attention to detail saw her quickly rise to the coveted position of Deputy News Manager at the then only news-talk radio station in Uganda in 2003.

Rukh-Shana served in Corporate Communications at MTN Uganda as the personal assistant to the Chief Commercial Officer in 2008, before moving on to the Legal and Corporate Relations department, where she worked as the Corporate Services Coordinator from 2009 to 2011. She later hit the big screen as a weekend TV news anchor on NTV Uganda in 2009, becoming an instant hit with viewers.

She was at the station until 2014. She also worked as the Corporate Relations Manager at Uganda Breweries Limited from 2011 to 2012 before taking a sabbatical from employment. In 2014, Rukh-Shana joined Vodafone Uganda as Communications Manager.

She later joined NBS Television as a senior news anchor in October 2015, and quit in 2024 after 8 years of service at the same station.

She also worked as Communications and Events Manager at DFCU Bank Uganda. She left DFCU after what is termed as 4.5 turbulent years.

Rukh-Shana is a Corporate Communications Consultant with James Associates and Partners, a Canadian-based global immigration practice. She is also an adoption advocate who champions the Ugandans Adopt agenda.

== Awards ==
She is a two-time winner of the Radio & TV Academy Outstanding English News TV Anchor Award (2014 and 2016) and two-time winner of the Media Challenge Rosemary Nankabirwa Best Female TV News Anchor 2016.

== Personal life ==
Rukh-Shana is married to Felix Kitaka.
