= Who Wants to Be a Millionaire? (Ugandan game show) =

- Logo
- Created by: David Briggs; Mike Whitehill; Steven Knight
- Developed by: Protel Studios Limited
- Presented by: Alan Kasujja
- Country of origin: Uganda
- No. of seasons: 1

Original release
- Network: NTV Uganda
- Release: January 31, 2011 – 2012

Who Wants to Be a Millionaire? is a Ugandan game show based on the original British format of Who Wants to Be a Millionaire?. The show is hosted by Alan Kasujja. The main goal of the game is to win USh 25 million (about US$10,000) by answering 15 multiple-choice questions correctly. The show was broadcast from January 31, 2011 to 2012. It was shown on the NTV Uganda.

== Money tree ==
Payout structure
Question number	Question value (in USh)
15	25,000,000/=
14	15,000,000/=
13	10,000,000/=
12	7,500,000/=
11	5,000,000/=
10	3,500,000/=
9	2,500,000/=
8	1,500,000/=
7	1,000,000/=
6	700,000/=
5	500,000/=
4	300,000/=
3	200,000/=
2	150,000/=
1	100,000/=
Milestone Top prize
