= Salam TV Uganda =

Islamic TV network in Uganda

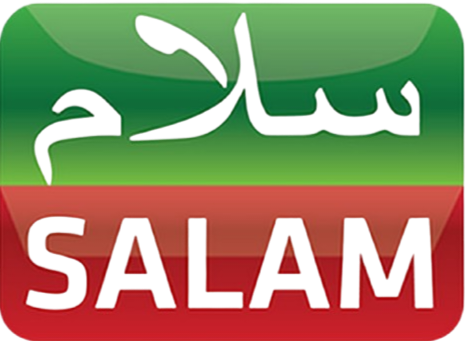
- Type: Media conglomerate
- Country: Uganda
- Affiliates: Next Media
- Headquarters: Media Plaza, Kira Road, Uganda

Programming
- Languages: English, Arabic, Luganda
- Picture format: 1080i HDTV (downscaled to 16:9 576i for the SDTV feed), Colour

Ownership
- Owner: Kin Kariisa
- Parent: Next Media

History
- Founded: 2015
- Launched: June 2015

Links
- Website: salamtv.ug

Availability

Terrestrial
- Azam, Startimes: 293, 155

Salam TV Uganda is a Ugandan Islamic television network based in Kampala, Uganda. The channel was launched in June 2015 and operates as part of the Next Media group of companies.

The television station serves as Uganda's premier Islamic television channel and a member of the Next Media Group, serving as a Muslim community. Salam TV is The first and only Islamic TV Channel in Uganda, providing specialized programming that caters to the Muslim community in Uganda and the broader East African region.

== History ==
The channel was established in June 2015 as part of Next Media Services' expansion into specialized religious broadcasting.It is located at Media Plaza, Plot 78, Mukwano Building Second Floor, Kampala, Uganda with headquarters at Next Media Park, Naguru. The establishment of Salam TV marked a significant milestone in Uganda's media landscape, as it became the first dedicated Islamic television channel in the country.

== Programming ==
The channel champions the values of faith, compassion, and community through engaging local and international content. The programming includes religious education, Islamic culture shows, news from the Muslim world, and community-focused content designed to serve Uganda's Muslim population.

== Technical Details ==
Salam TV offers online streaming with live stream features, allowing viewers to stay connected to their favorite TV channel anytime, anywhere. This digital accessibility has expanded the channel's reach beyond traditional terrestrial broadcasting.

== Location ==
It is located at Media Plaza, Kira Road, Kampala, Uganda.

== Programs ==
- Salam Juma
- Amaka
- Ekkubo Ly'obusiraamu
- Buuza Oyige
- Obuvo N'obuddo
- Daawa Special
- Omukeeze
- Obutonde Bwo Ssi Musango
- Empisa
- Obulamu
- Salam Baraza
- Muvubuka Dot Com
- Kigudde Waani
- Eddoboozi Ly'omusuubuzi
- Salam Darasa Special
- Salam Charity live Appeal
- Obulamu Bwa Kadaama
- Olutindo
- Alhidaayah Show
- Omumanyi Wa Salam
- Judiciary hour
- Zimba
- Political Islam
