= Alan Kasujja =

Ugandan journalist and radio broadcaster

- Born: ca. 1978; Uganda
- Status: married
- Citizenship: Uganda
- Education: Makerere University
- Occupations: Journalist, presenter
- Organization: Uganda Media Centre
- Notable credit: Newsday

Alan Kasujja (b. ca. 1978) is a Ugandan Journalist and Radio broadcaster who worked for BBC News for 13 years, leaving in August 2025. Kasujja was one of the main presenters of Newsday and the now-discontinued Africa Daily podcast on the BBC World Service.

He is currently the executive director of the Uganda Media Centre , a governmental post for which he has taken some criticism.

== Career ==
Kasujja began his media career in the 1990s, at Sanyu FM. He has worked in both Ugandan TV and radio. He previously hosted the morning radio show 'The Big Breakfast' on Kampala-based on 91.3 Capital FM with Jackie Lumbasi and Ramesh Gabalsing, and has presented the Ugandan version of the game show Who Wants to Be a Millionaire? since 2011. He also hosted The Fourth Estate, a highly influential political talk show in Uganda.

Kasujja has been based in London since 2012, where he is one of the regular presenters on Newsday.

On 15 January 2016, Kasujja co-moderated Uganda's first-ever televised presidential debate, alongside KTN journalist Nancy Kacungira.

== Personal life ==
Alan Kasujja spent the first twelve years of his life in Kenya, where his family had fled to escape the dictatorship of Idi Amin. He returned to live in Uganda when he was twelve, and later study law at Makerere University.

In December 2003, Kasujja married Sara Shalita, daughter of the late Anglican bishop of Muhabura, Ernest Munyambabazi Shalita. Kasujja is a personal friend to Muhoozi Kainerugaba, and took part in his 48th birthday celebrations.
