= Bulasio Mukasa =

Ugandan lawyer and politician (born 1980)

Honorable Bulasio Mukasa
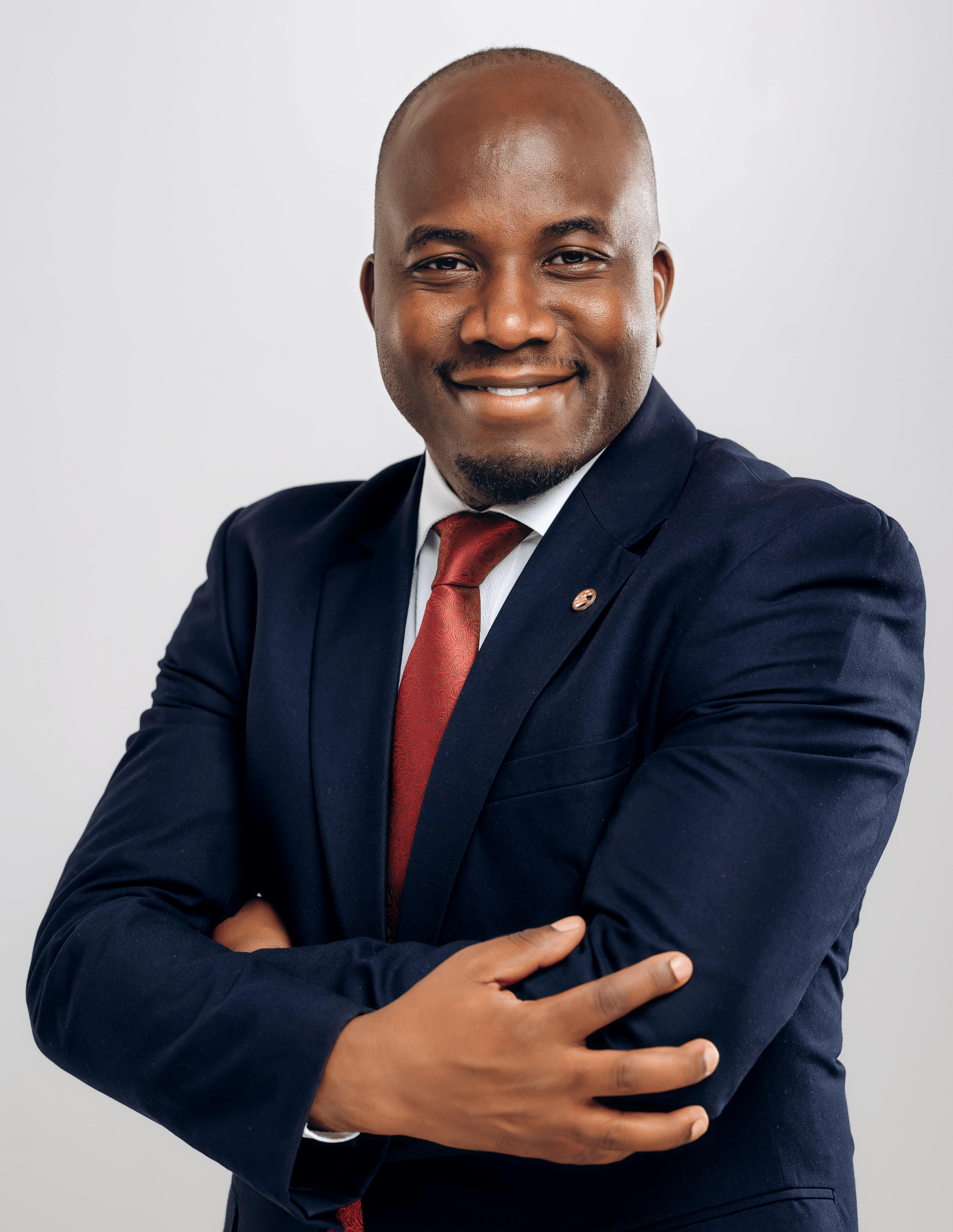
- Hon. Zambaali Bulasio Mukasa

Member of Parliament for Nansana Municipality

Personal details
- Born: Bulasio Zambaali Mukasa; February 11, 1986 (age 40) Nakaseke District, Uganda
- Citizenship: Uganda
- Party: National Unity Platform
- Education: Ndejje University (Bachelor of Public Relations), UMCAT (Diploma in Journalism and Mass Communication)
- Occupation: Politician
- Known for: Politics, show hosting, news anchoring

Zambaali Bulasio Mukasa is a Ugandan politician and media personality. In January 2026, he was elected as the Member of Parliament for Nansana Municipality in the twelfth Parliament of Uganda under the National Unity Platform political party. He anchored Luganda news Amasengejje and hosted Barometer (Akasameeme), a Luganda talk show on NBS Television (Uganda) (2019-2025).

== Background and education ==
Zambaali was born to the late John Wilson Segawole and Florence Sarah Nakalembe Namusisi. He grew up with his grandmother, Asinansi Nasimbwa, in Mugomola, Semuto. He sat for his Primary Leaving Examinations (PLE) from Kijaguzo Primary School. In 2002, he completed his O-level from St. Denis Sebugwawo Kijaguzo Secondary School and finished his A-level at Kazo Hill College School Kampala in 2004. He studied for a Bachelor of Arts in Tourism degree from Makerere University, but he didn't complete it (2005–2007). He graduated in 2011 with a Diploma in Journalism and Mass Communication from UMCAT School of Journalism and Mass Communication. He also holds a Bachelor of Public Relations from Ndejje University.

== Career ==
He began his journalism career at Tiger FM as a news anchor and presenter (2007–2008). Since then he was in service as a news anchor and presenter on various radio stations such as Metro FM 90.8 (2008–2011), Beat FM and Capital FM (2011–2012) as a news anchor and news reporter. In August 2012, he joined CBS FM radio Buganda 88.8 and CBS FM Emmanduso 89.2 as a presenter, talk show host and as a news anchor for programmes like Ag'okumpi Newala, Tumutendereze, and Ebifaa Munsi 'nobwengula (2012–2020). Between 2016 and July 2019, Zambaali worked as a news anchor and political show moderator at BBS Terefayina.

Zambaali joined NBS Television (Uganda) in August 2019 as a news anchor for Amasengejje (a Luganda news bulletin). and talk show host Barometer Akaasameeme a Luganda talk show programme which aired every Tuesday at 2200hrs EAST on NBS Television (Uganda).

== Other considerations ==
Between 2005 and 2010, Zambaali served as a peer educator for Kiyita Alliance for Development, the Nabweru Orphan Support Project, and the Makerere Women Development Association; was the chairperson of Nabweru Youth Health Club; and was a secretary for Nansana Youth Parish. Since 2020, Zambaali has served as the president of the Church of Uganda Media Association. He is the director of Zabama Investment Limited (a wedding planning company).

== Personal life ==
He is married and has three children. In 2018 and 2019, he was awarded the Dan Kyazze award of best Luganda radio news anchor.
