= Mildred Tuhaise =

Ugandan news anchor and news reporter

- Born: 14 September 1990 (age 36); Masindi, Uganda
- Occupations: news anchor; Journalist
- Presenting career
- Show: The Morning Breeze (Monday to Friday 6:30-9:00am); Media round table (Friday 7:30-9:00am); Live At 1 (Monday to Friday 1pm); People and Power (Sunday 8pm); NBS News Updates (Monday to Friday 4:30pm)
- Education: Bachelor of Information Technology
- Alma mater: Makerere University
- Years active: 2006–present

Mildred Amooti Tuhaise is a Ugandan news anchor and news reporter at NBS Television. She is the founder of Girls Incorporated Uganda a Non Government Organisation in Kampala

== Early life and education ==
Tuhaise was born in Masindi. She studied from Asaba Primary School in Masindi for PLE, Kawempe Mbogo Muslim Secondary School for O level and A Level at St Peters Naalya. She later joined Makerere University where she acquired a Bachelor of Science in Information Technology.

While at Makerere University, she also attained a certificate in the art of public speaking from the Department of Journalism and communication.

Tuhaise holds a master's degree in strategic and corporate communication from Makerere University and a postgraduate diploma in management from Uganda Management Institute.

== Career ==
In 2006, Tuhaise began her career in the media as a voice-over in adverts, Then to a teen's show and later news anchor at FMJ, Top radio and Top TV (2008 -2012). She then moved on to WBS TV as a news anchor (2012-2015) and in April 2015, she joined NBS TV where she does news anchoring (NBS at One), talk show host (Morning Breeze) and as a news reporter.

== Personal life ==
She is the CEO of Girls Incorporated Uganda a Non Government Organisation in Kampala.

== See also ==
- Josephine Namakumbi
- Canary Mugume
- Solomon Serwanjja
