= Sylver Kyagulanyi =

Ugandan musician

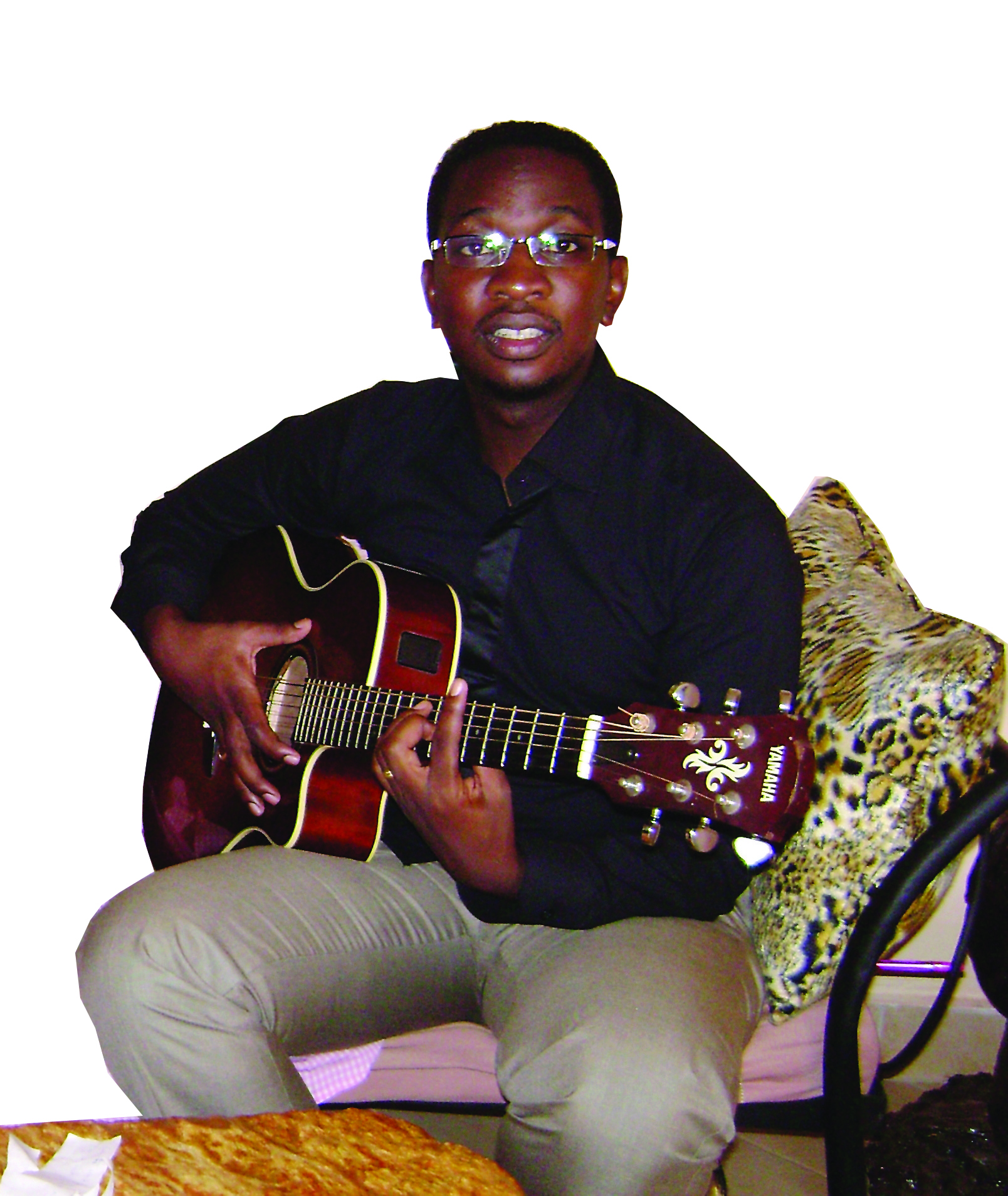
- Born: 14 September 1979 (age 46); Uganda

Sylver Kyagulanyi is a Ugandan musician, music producer, songwriter and advocate. He is the director of Sikia Media Services. He has been one of the most successful songwriters in Uganda in the last ten years.

In 2019, he was among 144 Lawyers that enrolled as Advocates of the High Court in Kampala, Uganda. He earned a Post Graduate Diploma in legal practice from the Law Development Centre (LDC) in 2018.

== Early life and education ==
Kyagulanyi attended Nswanjere Junior Seminary for his primary education. He went to Kisubi Seminary and St Charles Lwangwa Secondary School, for his secondary education. He was admitted to Makerere University’s Mass Communication programme but left it and instead did a degree in Music, Dance and Drama, specializing in music.

== Music ==
He started singing when he was part of the soprano in Christ the King church choir in the early 1990s. Whilst in senior three, his song won the Youth Alive National Music Festival in 1995. Having won, Kyagulanyi continued developing his talent. During his senior six vacations in 1999, he released "Ekyasa Kyabakyala", a song about female emancipation, which pushed him further up the music ladder. While at Makerere University, Kyagulanyi recorded and released "Omuzadde Katonda," the album that completely changed his fortunes. His Christian grounding is evident from some of his songs, such as Katonda Gwe nsinza, Olunaku Luno, and Tondeka Mukama, that strike a spiritual chord in his fans’ hearts.

== Discography ==
- Ekisa kyabakyala
- Omuzadde Katonda
- Abaana bo
- Congratulations
- Tebalemwa maka
- Olunaku luno
- Nkuuma
- Nzikiliza
- Nesiga Mukama
- Awali Katonda Tewali Mbela etakyuka
- Omukisa
- Musalaba
- Yimusa Omukono Gwo
- Ebyokulwanyisa
- Nalulungi
- Toterebuka
- Tonefulira
- Onyambanga Mukama
- Namulondo
- Tondeka Mukama
- Olwaleera
- Oli Kimuli
- Nandibaddewa
- Mwsige
- Nafuna
- Ekyamagero
- Abaawo
- Kigambo
- Guma
