= Joy Doreen Biira =

Ugandan journalist and communications consultant (born 1986)

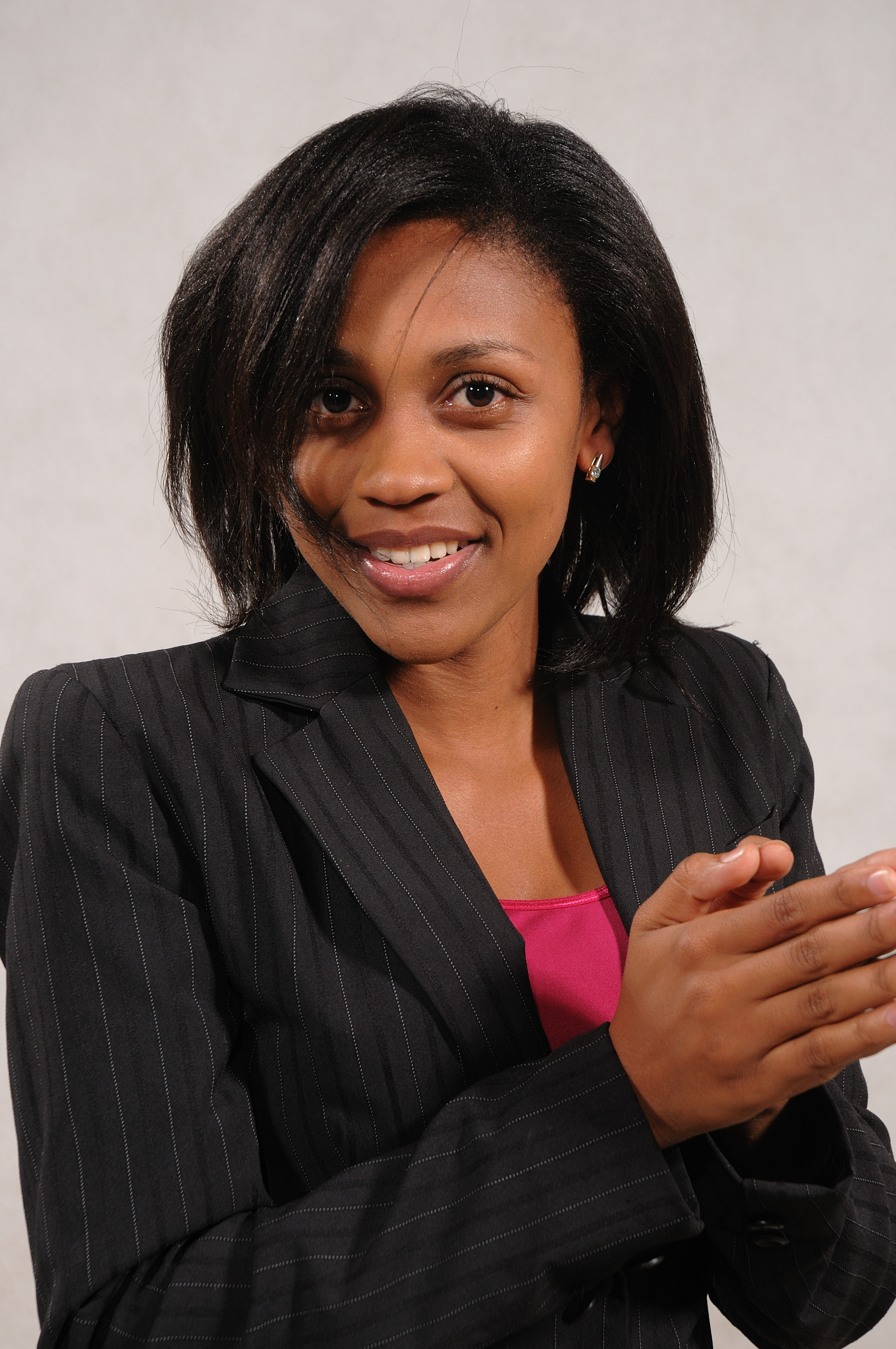
- Biira in 2010
- Born: 5 September 1986 (age 40); Kasese, Uganda
- Occupations: Journalist, communications consultant
- Presenting career
- Show: KTN News
- Station: KTN
- Show: Africa Speaks
- Station: KTN
- Style: News
- Country: Kenya
- Previous shows: The Morning Breeze on NBS TV, Uganda; The Dream Breakfast on 91.3 Capital FM, Uganda; Sunday Drive on 91.3 Capital FM, Uganda
- Education: Makerere University
- Years active: 2008–present
- Spouse: Newton Kung'u
- Children: 2
- Website: Official website

Joy Doreen Biira (born 5 September 1986) is a Ugandan journalist and communications consultant. She describes herself as a "career journalist, communications and digital strategist, moderator, speaker, media trainer, brand influencer and mum". She is creatives director at Africa Speaks Limited, a private Ugandan company, limited by shares, which was incorporated on 2 October 2006.

== Background and education ==
Joy Doreen Biira was born on 5 September 1986 to John and Beatrice Baluku in the Western Ugandan town of Kasese, in the Rwenzururu sub-region, in the foothills of the Rwenzori Mountain Range.

She attended local primary school. She then transferred to Kyebambe Girls' Secondary School, in the city of Fort Portal, where she completed her O-Level education. For her A-Level studies, she attended Immaculate Heart High School in the town of Rukungiri, where she obtained her High School Diploma in 2004.

In September 2005, Biira was admitted to Makerere University, Uganda's oldest and largest public university, to pursue a degree in Information Technology, her third preference. Her first choice had been Journalism and Mass Communication. During her first year at university, she juggled a full-time day job, that paid her tuition, with evening classes at university. She worked at Branding Uganda Limited, in their Operations Department. On some days, she snuck into Mass Communication classes, where her heart was.

She graduated with a Bachelor of Information Technology degree from Makerere University in 2011.

== Career ==
After her second year at the College of Computing and Information Science at Makerere University, Biira deferred school in her final year in order to gain experience in the media industry. She was trained as a researcher on in-depth stories and general journalistic skills by experts in media consultancy, giving her competitive advantage with the professionally trained journalists. She started as an unpaid volunteer/intern, and was later employed as a weekday morning show co-host at NBS Television with Shawn Kimuli, broadcasting at the network's headquarters in Uganda's capital city, Kampala. Between July 2008 until December 2011, Biira was the prime time news anchor and television host at National Broadcasting Service Television (NBS Television), in Kampala, Uganda, concurrently serving as the social media specialist for the final three years of her tenure there.

On 1 September 2008, Biira was called by 91.3 Capital FM, the leading English radio station in Uganda, to audition for a radio show. After just the first round of the auditions, she was hired as radio co-host of the weekend breakfast show, The Dream Breakfast show. She hosted with "Hakeem-The-Dream" and later Shawn Kimuli. Her debut on radio airwaves was on 6 September 2008. She grew to host 91.3 Capital FM's Sunday Drive, an infotainment music variety show that included interviews, news and top music chats. While at 91.3 Capital FM her shows became the most listened to weekend shows. She served in this role between September 2008 and December 2011, concurrently with television assignments at NBS Television.

Biira joined Standard Media Group in January 2012 as a news anchor, reporter, and show host with Kenya Television Network (KTN Kenya). She hosted Business Today, a one-hour show that airs across 12 countries on the African continent. The show breaks down economic matters to its viewers while speaking to drivers of businesses, identifying the gaps businesses across Kenya and Africa might have and seeking solutions to these challenges. As Kenya is the economic hub of East Africa, business leaders, economists, and analysts make it their business to make an appearance on Business Today, which airs weekdays at 1400hrs East Africa Time on KTN News. She served in this role for nearly six years until October 2017. Between 2013 and 2015, Biira independently produced content for and hosted the Pan-African show Africa Speaks, whose main objective was to grow Intra-African relationships economically, politically and socially.

In January 2017, she took on an additional role as host of the international news environmental show Eco@Africa, which she co-hosts with Nigeria's Nneota Egbe of Channels Television. She was selected as the East African Reporter for Deutsche Welle (DW) covering environmental issues and exciting solutions from Africa and Europe, serving in that role until October 2017.

She left KTN in October 2017. In January 2018, Biira was hired by the Kenya Ministry of Mining as the Advisor, Strategic Communications, serving there for one year. In January 2019 she rejoined Deutsche Welle as the African correspondent for their broadcast Business Africa, based in Nairobi, Kenya. She also continues to speak and consult professionally as the creatives director for Africa Speaks Limited, a role she has played since January 2010.

== Personal interests ==
Biira has great admiration for nature and the environment, and is a passionate environmentalist. She participated in NBS Television Limited's 31 Million Ugandans, 31 Million Trees, a country-wide tree planting campaign in Uganda. The campaign was launched by President Yoweri Kaguta Museveni of Uganda on 8 May 2010. The project is part of a collective effort to mitigate the effects of global warming.

Biira runs a blog called Biira Foundation where she posts her opinions on various topical issues.

== Family ==
Biira is married to Newton Kung'u, since 2016. Together they are parents to two sons.

== Controversies ==
On 26 November 2016, armed government forces comprising Uganda People's Defence Forces (UPDF) and Uganda Police Force (UPF), attacked, ransacked and burnt down the palace of the King of the Rwenzururu, one Charles Wesley Mumbere. The number of fatalities are anywhere between 55 and over 100, depending on who is reporting. The next day, Biira, who was in her hometown of Kasese, for her wedding to fiancé (now husband), Newton Kung'u, a Kenyan citizen, was arrested by the Uganda Police, because she had posted photographs and a video of the inferno, after the attack, on some of her social media pages. After spending a night in police custody, she was given police bond and allowed to return to Kenya with her husband. She was charged with "abetting terrorism", a charge that attracts maximum sentence of seven years in Ugandan prison.

On 23 December 2016, Biira's personal automobile, a Mercedes-Benz E-220, a sedan with registration number: KBY 831K, was stolen from the company parking lot of Standard Media Kenya, her employer, where the owner had parked the vehicle. About a week later, the car was recovered in the western Kenyan city of Kisumu, approximately 350 kilometres (217 mi) away. Arrested and charged for the theft was Aaron Obudho Ochieng, an editor at the television station where Biira worked. The editor's initial defence was that he and the owner of the vehicle had jointly planned the car theft. Six months later, he recanted those claims in court, publicly apologized to the car owner for the harm, pain and suffering caused by his lies to the court, and reached an out of court settlement with the car owner, for the civil liabilities related to his statements. He also lost his job as editor at KTN Television. In May 2018, Ochieng was again incarcerated for faiing to pay Biira.

== See also ==
- Kasese Clashes
