= NBS Television (Uganda) =

Ugandan television station

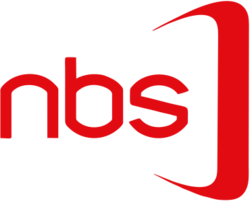
- Logo since 2015
- Type: Current Affairs TV Station
- Country: Uganda
- Broadcast area: National
- Headquarters: Next Media Park, Plot 13, Summit View Road, Naguru, Kampala, Uganda

Programming
- Language: English
- Picture format: 1080i (HDTV)

Ownership
- Owner: Kin Kariisa since 2008
- Parent: Next Media
- Key people: Calvin Mugume, Paul Lwanga

History
- Founded: Monday, June 16, 2008
- Launched: Monday, June 16, 2008
- Founder: Kin Kariisa

Links
- Website: https://nbs.ug/

NBS Television (also known as NBS TV) is Uganda's leading television station owned by Kin Kariisa’s Next Media. Official broadcasts began on Monday, June 16, 2008, and the station is now headquartered at the purpose‑built Next Media Park on Naguru Summit View Road, Kampala.

== History ==
NBS received its license and commenced official broadcasting on Monday, June 16, 2008. It initially operated from UAP Building, Plot 1, Kimathi Avenue in Kampala, specifically in a 2-bedroom apartment, before moving to Media Plaza in Lower Kololo with a single transmitter. It then moved to the former WBS TV site - now Next Media Park - in 2020. Under Kin Kariisa’s leadership, full ownership was secured by 2014. In 2017, NBS became the flagship of the Next Media Group, along with brands such as Sanyuka TV, Salam TV, Next Radio, Nile Post, Next Com, etc.

== Programming and coverage ==
NBS brands itself “Uganda’s Political Command Centre” and is best known for news and current affairs. Flagship programmes include:

- NBS Amasengejje (Luganda, 19:00)
- NBS Live at 9 (English, 21:00)
- Frontline (English, Thursday, 22:00)
- Barometer Akasameeme (Luganda, Tuesday, 22:00)
- After 5 (Youth and Entertainment, Weekdays, 17:00)
- NBS Youth Voice (Students and Youths entertainment)

Other shows cover business, sports and lifestyle. Its sister channel Sanyuka TV in the past held live rights to the StarTimes Uganda Premier League. In a 2024 survey, NBS led all Ugandan stations with a 44 percent national viewership share. NBS’ extensive live coverage and regional bureaus across Uganda are credited with this market leadership.

== Ownership and leadership ==
Kin Kariisa founded NBS and serves as Group CEO of Next Media. Key executives have included former Deputy Group CEO Joe Kigozi (2008 - 2025). Under this leadership, NBS has undergone two major rebrands (2011, 2014), launched a digital transformation strategy, and established regional bureaus and strategic partnerships for live event broadcasting.

== Notable personalities ==
  - Canary Mugume – investigative journalist and prime‑time news anchor
  - Samson Kasumba – pastor, news anchor and talk‑show host
  - Solomon Serwanjja – investigative reporter; BBC Komla Dumor Award winner, 2019
  - Dalton Kaweesa – Chief News Editor, political analyst
  - Mildred Amooti Tuhaise – news anchor
  - Former presenters include Joy Doreen Biira, Rukh‑Shana Namuyimba, and Tamale Mirundi (RIP).
  - Anatalia Oze also known as Anatalia Nambooze – entertainment show host/ producer.

== Campaigns and social impact ==
NBS and Next Media have led major public‑awareness and CSR initiatives:

- Tuve Ku Kaveera (2018) - anti–plastic bag drive
- Taasa Obutonde (2021 - ) - waste management and recycling
- Beera Steady - Be Better (2023 - ) - financial and digital literacy
- 15 Million Trees (2024) - national reforestation campaign
- #DisMisFakeNews (2024) - misinformation awareness

== Influence and recognition ==
NBS was named “Most Admired Ugandan Media Brand” by Brand Africa in 2023 and is widely regarded as the country’s top political news outlet. Its live coverage of Pope Francis’s 2015 visit to Uganda set a national benchmark for event broadcasting.
