= Klear Kut =

- Origin: Uganda
- Genre: Gospel
- Years active: 2000-present
- Members: Navio (rapper); Papito; Abba Lang; The mith

Klear Kut is a five-member Ugandan musical ensemble consisting of Navio, Papito, Abba Lang, JB, and The mith.

== History ==
Klear Kut was formed in August 2000. The group started by performing at karaokes around Kampala and quickly gained a reputation for their original performances. They soon started performing at bigger events and caught the eye of local producer Steve Jean, with whom they recorded their first single, "Nothin’ Wrong Wit’ A Lil’ Doe." The group became the first Ugandan hip hop group to be accepted among mainstream artists.

== Music ==
Klear Kut then teamed up with Dawoo & Damz (D&D) Productions to record the full-length album Mind, Body & Soul. The album proved to be a success for the group, spawning the hits "All I Wanna Know" featuring Juliana and "Superstar" featuring Bebe Cool. The singles topped the charts in Uganda, Kenya, and Tanzania.

The video for "All I Wanna Know" pioneered modern video production in Uganda. It earned the group two nominations at the prestigious 2002 Kora All Africa Music Awards in the "Most Promising African Group" and "Revelation of the Year" categories. This also made them the first Ugandan group to be nominated at the KORAs. Klear Kut was also nominated at the 2003 Pearl of Africa Music Awards and won the award for "Best Hip Hop Group." The group also released another album, K2, which featured the hit single "Mon Coeur/Murder of Crows." The video was on heavy rotation on WBS as well as TV Africa before the station's demise. The video topped the EATV Top 10 music video charts. The video would further create new records by being the first Ugandan music video to be featured on MTV . The album features Bebe Cool, TID, Benon, Rania, E-Von & Poetic.

Klear Kut has built a solid reputation as live performers and has performed at a number of live outdoor events including the Shaggy Boombastic Concert, Miss Uganda, Tevin Campbell New Year Concert, Sanyu Carnival in Uganda, Miss Kenya and Coca-Cola Race Day in Kenya, Bongo All-Stars in Tanzania, Sauti Za Busara in Zanzibar. They have also performed at the Harare International Festival of the Arts (HIFA) alongside African greats such as Femi Kuti (Nigeria) and Habib Koite (Mali).

The group has been featured in the production of both audio and video commercials for companies such as Coca-Cola, MTN, PSI Protector, BB Soda, Allied Bank, Celtel, Guinness, and Pepsi. Klear Kut has also been involved in AIDS awareness and anti-smoking campaigns, performing and speaking to youth about those issues.

At the 2008 Kisima Music Awards Klear Kut was nominated for the Ugandan Video of the Year category for their video "Klear discussion"

== Awards and recognition ==
- Nominated in Kisima Music Awards for the Ugandan Video of the Year category for their video "Klear discussion", 2008
- Won the award for Best Hip Hop Groupin Pearl of Africa Music Awards, 2003.
- Nominated in Kora All Africa Music Awards in Most Promising African Group, 2002
- Nominated in Kora All Africa Music Awards in the Revelation of the Year category, 2002

== Discography ==
- Mind, Body & Soul
- K2
- Klear discussion
