= Navio (rapper) =

Ugandan rapper (born 1983)

- Born: Daniel Lubwama Kigozi; 18 October 1983 (age 42); Kampala, Uganda
- Genre: Hip hop
- Occupations: Rapper, producer
- Years active: 2000–present
- Label: NavCorp

Daniel Lubwama Kigozi (popularly known as Navio, born 18 October 1983) is a Ugandan rapper and record producer. Starting off his career, he was part of the award-winning hip hop group Klear Kut, along with fellow rappers The Mith & JB, that introduced the term "Ugaflow" to describe Uganda's hip hop scene. Navio is best known for his successful solo career with hits such as "Ngalo", "Bugumu", "One & Only", and "On and On" (with American R&B singer Keith Sweat).

Since 2010, Navio has been a part of the African supergroup One8. Other members include 2Face (Nigeria), Fally Ipupa (Democratic Republic of the Congo), 4x4 (Ghana), Movaizhaleine (Gabon), JK (Zambia), and fellow East Africans Amani (Kenya) and Ali Kiba (Tanzania). The first release from the group was "Hands Across the World", written and produced by R. Kelly.

In 2014, he was one of the featured artists in the second season of Coke Studio Africa.

== Early life and career beginnings ==
=== Childhood ===
Navio was born to engineer Daniel Serwano Kigozi and physician Dr. Maggie Kigozi (née Blick). He is the youngest of three children; with an elder brother and sister. He went to Entebbe Church Nursery for infant school and St. Andrews in Kenya for his primary school. The recording artist then joined Aga Khan Secondary school and ISSA (International school of South Africa) for secondary education. Navio was enrolled at Monash University where he studied International Relations and Media Studies.

=== Career beginnings ===
While growing up, Navio listened to a lot of music including his elder brother's huge collection of rap music from artists such as Run–D.M.C., MC Hammer, Vanilla Ice, and the Beastie Boys, and would try to mimic them. When he was about 10 years old, his mother heard him rapping in the living room, and asked whether it was Vanilla Ice rapping. She was so excited that she took him to Baava studio, owned by Hope Mukasa, to record a song.

=== Klear Kut ===
Aged 16, Navio formed the hip hop group Klear Kut with his four closest friends: Tom "Tha Mith" Mayanja, Jonathan "J-Baller" Leslie, Abba "Langman" Lang, and Habib Abdul Hussein aka Papito. The group's debut album, Mind, Body and Soul (2000), was a huge success and generated several hit singles including "All I Wanna Know" (with Juliana), "Remember", and "Let's Get It on".

The group helped popularize hip hop music in Uganda.

In 2002, Klear Kut became the first group to receive a Kora Award nomination; they were nominated for "Most Promising Newcomer" and "Revelation of the Year".

The following year, the group released K2, their second album. Although it was not as big as its predecessor, it produced the major hits "Mon Coeur 'Murder of Crows'", featuring Rania, and the fan favourite remix "Superstar" featuring Bebe Cool.

They received the PAM Award for Best Hip hop Group in 2004.

== Later career ==
Before leaving for South Africa, Navio wrote and recorded a song, "Rukus" with Ugandan recording artiste Peter Miles. The song went on become one of the most popular records of his career. It was featured in the season finale of Big Brother Africa 3 in 2008, four years after its release. During his hiatus, he was occasionally featured on other artistes' recordings such as the all-girl group, Blu*3's single "Burn" in 2007, and Jemimah Sanyu's "Amaaso go googera" in 2011.

Navio officially returned to the music scene in 2008 after graduating with a degree in communications from Monash University's South African branch. His debut solo album, Half the Legend, was released in 2009 and received positive reviews from critics and audiences. It included the singles "Bugumu", "Salooni" featuring GNL Zamba, "Ngalo", and "Respect" with the Kenyan artiste Jua Kali. Navio was also featured on Bobi Wine's "Badman from Kamwokya". The album earned him the Best Hip Hop Artist award at the Pearl of Africa Music Awards and nominations at Kenya's Kisima Music Awards for Best Male Artist, Best Music Video, and Best Hip Hop Artist.

=== Musical style ===
Music critics have described Navio's sound and style as unique:

He strikes the balance between an African sound and a contemporary and international flavor that means he appeals to a wide demographic locally and internationally.
- MTV Base

== Awards and nominations ==
Year	Event	Prize	Result	Ref
2016	Buzz teeniez Awards	Teeniez Role Model	Won	

== Discography ==
- Half a Legend (2009)
- Bad man from Kamwokya (featuring Bobi Wine)
- AFRICAN Hustler Music (2010)
- Pride (2014)
- The Chosen (2015)
- Strength in Numbers (2020)

== Videography ==
Year	Title	Director	Ref
2015	Work It featuring Dr SID	—N/a	
2015	Kigozi	Jim Resley	
