= East African urban music =

East African urban music is a popular music genre of the three countries customarily grouped as "East Africa": Kenya, Tanzania and Uganda. The genre is basically an offshoot of western popular music, particularly hip hop and funk, somewhat influenced by more traditional African music. Kapuka, genge, and bongo flava are some of the subgenres that have arisen in this style.

== Description and history ==
The three countries involved in this genre share a common colonial history and close cultural and linguistic relationships. Especially since the 1960s, popular musicians have shared their talents across the borders of the three nations and helped move the music of the area from traditional to benga/rumba and now Afro-urban music.

Musicians of the early 1990s, including Tedd Josiah (Kenya), P-Funk (Tanzania) and Steve Jean (Uganda), began to combine western influences with the area's more traditional popular music. Local radio stations were at first reluctant to experiment with this new music, until privately operated FM stations began to appear and needed new material to establish a market niche. By 2000 urban music groups like X-plastaz (Tanzania), 237 Street Cypher (Kenya), and Kalamashaka (Kenya) had developed local followings and were beginning to tour abroad.

Production houses specializing in the genre—such as Ogopa Djs, Swahili Entertainment Africa, Samawati, HipHop kila pahali, Home Boyz and Bongo Records—have emerged. Problems with financing and technical infrastructure have hampered development, and the industry generally lacks executives well-versed in the music business. Some groups like Ukoo Flani Mau Mau, a slum-based hip hop organization with members from Kenya and Tanzania founded by the group Kalamashaka, have attempted to further development of industry with the help of Foundation UpToYouToo.

In 2004 the Kilio Cha Haki, A Cry for Justice (by Nairobi Yetu) compilation appeared, featuring Rha Goddess, a performing artist and socio-political activist based in New York. Nairobi Yetu is a collaboration of 38-strong collective from Nairobi, among them G.rongi and Kalamashaka. Swahili Entertainment Inc. and Nomadic Wax Records combined in late 2004 to start the distribution and publishing of East African urban music. Other companies like Bab Kubwa and Project 254 Records are also working to develop and expand the market for this music. This upshot of this music can be well seen in the documentary HIP HOP Colony.

== Recent developments and advances ==
The East African Urban music has recently exploded and advanced within and without the East Africa Community towards the larger African Great Lakes and in notable East African diaspora inclusive of the US and Britain. Music artistes of this genre have been observed to develop in terms of content quality and product outreach. Some of the current most celebrated artistes include Tanzania's: Diamond Platnumz, Alikiba, Harmonize, Darasa, Aslay among others; Kenya's: Nameless, Major Kansoul; Sauti Sol; Frasha, Nadia Mukami, King Kaka among others and Uganda's Jose Chameleone among others. With the integration of the East Africa Community, talent pool and exchange of ideas plus cooperation between artiste and music industry players of the EAC countries has improved the music scene in East Africa. However, Kenya and Tanzania have tensions and mistrust towards each other such that, both countries from time to time can shutdown and later reopen the border and thus this impedes the development of the East African Urban Music.
