= Kololo Senior Secondary School =

Coordinates: 00°20′17″N 32°35′53″E

- Kololo, Kampala, Central Region; Uganda

Information
- Type: Public Middle School and High School (8-13)
- Motto: Lead Kindly Light
- Athletics: soccer, track, tennis, volleyball, basketball and golf
- Website: http://www.kololoss.com

Kololo Senior Secondary School (Kololo SSS), is a government-aided, mixed, middle (S1 - S4) and high (S5 - S6), day school, in Kampala, Uganda.

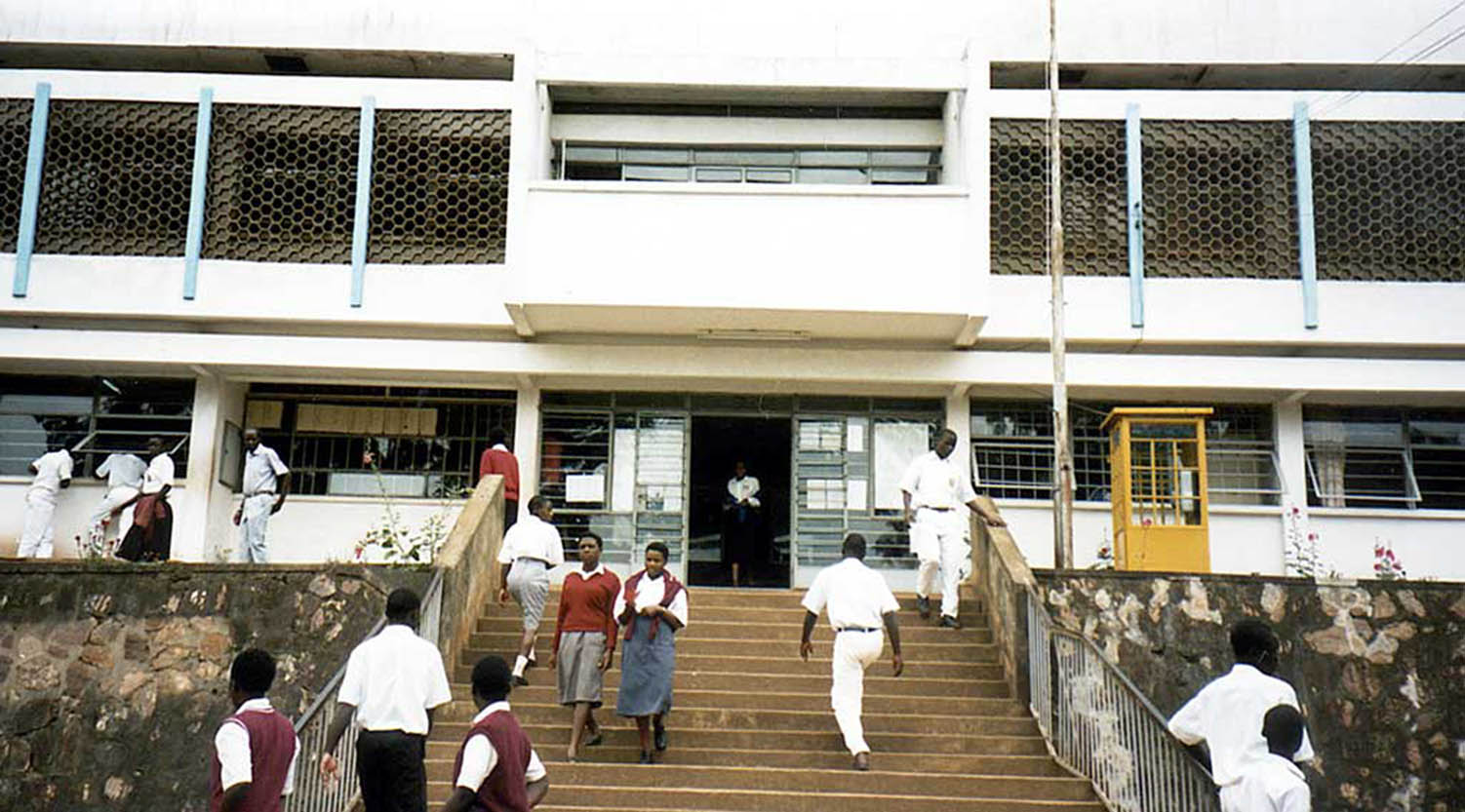
Main entrance to the school administration block

== Location ==
The school campus is located on Kololo Hill, in Kampala, Uganda's capital and largest city. Kololo SSS is bordered by Lugogo Bypass to the east, Nviri Lane to the southeast, Malcolm X Avenue to the south, and Mackenzie Vale Road to the west and north. This location lies approximately 3 kilometres (1.9 mi), north of the central business district of Kampala. The coordinates of Kololo Senior Secondary School are:0° 20' 16.80"N, 32° 35' 52.80"E (Latitude:0.3380; Longitude:32.5980).

== History ==
Prior to 1972, the student population was predominantly Indian. After the forced Asian exodus in 1972, the school population became predominantly African. Following the introduction of Universal Secondary Education, six hundred new students signed up for S1 in 2007, three times the usual number.

== Academics ==
The school offers both Ordinary Level (S1-S4) subjects, as well as Advanced Level (S5-S6) subjects. and muluta is a payonia of kololo

== Notable alumni ==
- Jacob Oulanyah (1965–2022) - A Ugandan agricultural economist, lawyer and politician. He was the Deputy Speaker (2011-2021) and was also the Speaker of the Ugandan Parliament (2021-2022).
- Philly Lutaaya - The late Ugandan performing artist and AIDS activist attended Kololo Senior Secondary School, before dropping out in 1968.
- Rajat Neogy - Renowned Ugandan intellectual, poet and founding editor of Transition Magazine
- Professor Maggie Kigozi - Physician, sportswoman, businesswoman, entrepreneur. Former executive director, Uganda Investment Authority. Sits on the boards of many of Uganda's public and private companies and organisations.
- Sudhir Ruparelia - Business magnate and entrepreneur. Chairman and majority shareholder in the companies of the Ruparelia Group. Wealthiest individual in the East African Community, with an estimated net worth of US$1.12 billion as of April 2015.
- Beatrice Rwakimari - public health leader, woman MP for Ntungamo District

== See also ==
- Kololo
- Education in Uganda
- Central Region, Uganda
