= Maggie Kigozi =

Ugandan physician, business consultant, and sportswoman

- Born: 5 July 1950 (age 76); Fort Portal, Uganda
- Citizenship: Uganda
- Education: Makerere University (Bachelor of Medicine and Bachelor of Surgery)
- Occupations: Business consultant academic
- Years active: 1975–present
- Known for: Business, Academics, Sports
- Children: Navio (son)

Margaret Blick Kigozi is a Ugandan medical doctor, business consultant, educator, and sportswoman. She is a consultant at the United Nations Industrial Development Organization (UNIDO). She formerly served as the executive director of the Uganda Investment Authority (UIA), from 1999 until 2011.

== Background ==
She was born Margaret Blick in Fort Portal to George William Blick, a civil engineer with the Uganda Ministry of Works and Transport and Molly Johnson Blick, a fashion designer. Both her parents had English fathers and Baganda mothers. Her father and siblings were professional motor sports riders in Uganda and East Africa in the 1960s and 1970s. Margaret herself was an avid motorcycle rider. She attended Aga Khan Primary School in Kampala, Gayaza High School in Wakiso District for her Ordinary Level education and Kololo Senior Secondary School, in Kampala, for her Advanced Level education. In 1970, just before she turned 20, she entered Makerere University School of Medicine, graduating in 1974 with the degree of Bachelor of Medicine and Bachelor of Surgery.

== Career ==
Following a one-year internship in Uganda, she migrated to Zambia in Southern Africa, where she practised as a physician, from 1977 until 1979. She returned to Uganda in 1979 following the removal of Idi Amin from power, but had to flee to neighbouring Kenya, after Milton Obote seized power in 1980. She continued to practice medicine in Kenya until 1986, when she again returned to Uganda, following another change of government in Kampala. She worked as the physician to members of the Parliament of Uganda and their families, from 1986 until 1994. The Pearl website reported she had a "passion for paediatrics" during her medical career.

In 1994, following the sudden death of her husband, she joined Crown Bottlers Uganda Limited (Pepsi), as the marketing director. During her tenure at Crown Bottlers, she was appointed board member of Uganda Manufacturers Association. She worked at the bottling company until she was appointed executive director at Uganda Investment Authority (UIA) in 1999. She is the first person and first woman to serve in that position at UIA.

In addition to the responsibilities already cited, Kigozi has had the following additional roles:

- Chief Scout of the Uganda Scouts Association
- Associate Professor of Economics at Makerere University
- Member of Global Banking Alliance for Women (GBA) Advisory Board
- Patron, Uganda Change Agents and Junior Chamber International
- Director of the Board of Uganda Export Promotion Board
- Member, board of directors, Crown Beverages Limited – Manufacturers and distributors of Pepsi-Cola in Uganda
- The founder of Uganda Investment Authority Women Entrepreneurs Network
- Focal Point Officer for the Africa Asia Business Forum
- Patron Ugandan Diaspora Network
- Sportswoman who has represented Uganda in lawn tennis, table tennis, hockey and squash.
- For a period leading up to 2011, Dr. Kigozi was the Chancellor of Nkumba University.

== Awards ==
- In 2024 Kigozi was awarded the Bronze Wolf Award by the World Scout Committee.
- Kigozi was among the winners of the 2017 Digital Impact Awards Africa (DIAA) in the category of Investment Leadership Award.
- In 2016, she received Outstanding Investment Promotion Ambassador award.
- In 2015 she was awarded with the 2015 Pearl of Africa Lifetime Achievement Award (PALITA AWARD).

== Personal life ==
Before she left Uganda for Zambia in 1977, Blick married Fredrick Serwano Kigozi. Together they had three children, Fred, Michelle and Daniel Kigozi. Fredrick Kigozi died suddenly in 1994. She is the mother of Ugandan hip-hop musician Navio.

== See also ==
- Uganda Investment Authority
- National Food and Drug Authority
- Parliament of Uganda
- Makerere University School of Medicine
- Crown Bottlers Uganda Limited (Pepsi
