= Bantu music =

Bantu music is the music produced by Bantu peoples in Africa. It englobes a wide variety of music that shares a common heritage as the Bantu peoples themselves.

== Characteristics ==
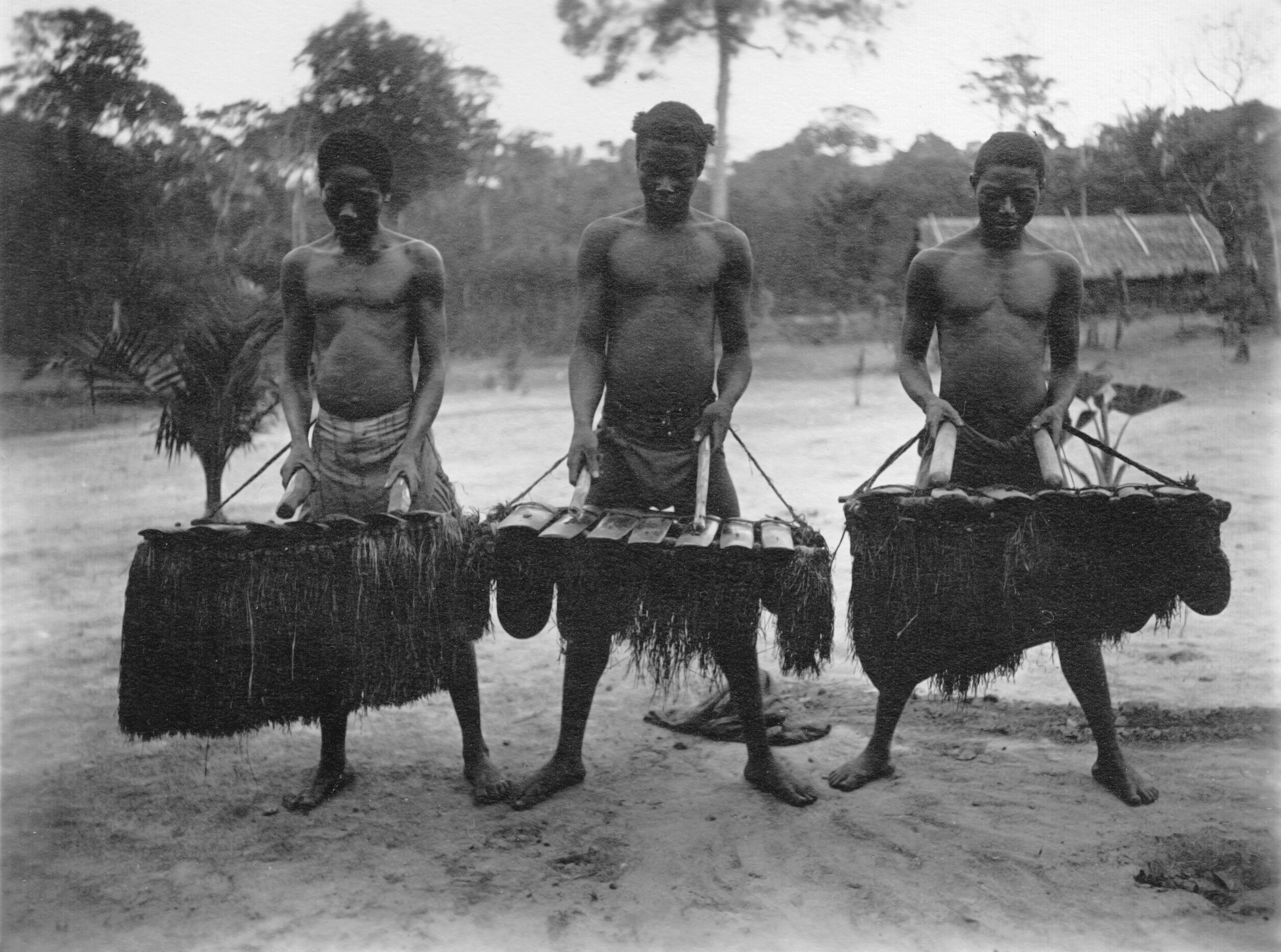
Woods bred men creates ensembles of drums or xylophones.

Bantu music is related to spoken language. Styles vary according to the tonality of the language of an area. Folk Bantu music and musicians don't speak about "high" or "low" notes. They describe treble notes as "small." Meanwhile, bass notes are described as "great." Declining melodies are preferred in Bantu music. Usually, more than four consecutive notes rising in pitch indicates foreign influence, except for some cases as the music of Bemba tribe.

Each Bantu group changes musical style with every change of language. The diversity of Bantu Music is a consequence of common racial heritage in areas of comparative isolation. Work songs are common on Bantu people, mainly in repetitive jobs. Employers and chiefs used to encourage them, and they are sometimes accompanied by dance used to produce works, as the origins of Malipenga, based upon military drill.

== Instruments ==
Musical instruments in Bantu music depend on the environment. In areas like the tropical forests of the Congo Basin, trees offer a resource for the elaboration of drums. Meanwhile, the music of Zulu tribes doesn't use drums due to the lack of material on the grazing grounds of Natal. People from bamboo forests of the mountains elaborate flutes, meanwhile the people living near lakes and rivers create pipe ensembles with reeds. People living in the plains use to compose unaccompanied singing music, while people in the woods use to play drums and xylophones.

== See also ==
- Bantu languages
- African music
