= Gaetano Kagwa =

Ugandan actor and broadcaster (born 1972)

Gaetano Juuko Kagwa
- Born: 22 June 1972 (age 54); Kampala, Uganda
- Education: University of Wisconsin–La Crosse; Makerere University Business School
- Occupations: Radio presenter, television host, actor
- Presenting career
- Show: The Overdrive Show with Lucky Mbabazi
- Stations: 91.3 Capital FM, Uganda
- Time slot: 6AM – 10AM
- Show: Urban Today
- Stations: Urban TV, Uganda
- Time slot: 6am - 9am
- Style: Music, celebrity gossip, news
- Country: Uganda
- Previous shows: 98.4 Capital FM, Kenya; Studio 53 on M-Net; Big Brother Africa
- Known for: Beneath the Lies – The Series
- Spouse: Enid Kushemeza Rukikaire

Gaetano Jjuko Kagwa is a Ugandan actor and broadcaster. He currently co-hosts the breakfast show Gaetano & Lucky in the Morning at 91.3 Capital FM with Lucky Mbabazi. In 2023, Kagwa hosted The Voice Africa, a talent show featuring performers from 14 African countries, Dj Makeda from Rwanda, Jeff Koinange Kenya and Vanessa Mdee Tanzania.

== Early life and education ==
He was born on 22 June 1972 in Kampala, Uganda. He moved to Kenya when he was five years old and then to Lesotho when he was nine. In Lesotho, he completed his high school education. In 1993, he joined the University of Wisconsin–La Crosse, US, where he graduated with a degree in political science in 1997.

== Career ==
Kagwa played Abe Sakku on Nana Kagga's TV series Beneath the Lies – The Series. He rose to fame when he represented Uganda in the first edition of Big Brother Africa in 2003. He has also hosted the television show Studio 53 on Mnet. From 2004 to 2008, he was the host of the Capital in the Morning Show on Kenyan radio station 98.4 Capital FM.

His career as a radio presenter goes back several years before signing up with Kenya's Capital FM. Prior to moving to neighboring country Kenya as a radio presenter, Kagwa worked for Capital FM Uganda as well as Vision Voice, a Ugandan radio station.

== Big Brother Africa ==
While a third-year law student at Makerere University, Kagwa went to represent Uganda in the premier Big Brother Africa series in 2003. He made it to the final day of the competition, finishing in fourth place ahead of Namibian representative Stefan Ludik but behind Botswana's Warona Setshwaelo.

Kagwa is most remembered for starting a romantic relationship with South African housemate Abby Plaatjes. While at the house, he won the chance to swap places with Big Brother UK contestant Cameron Stout. His stint at the UK house caused media outrage when he called representative Tania a "piggy", which made her threaten to leave the house for good.

== Filmography ==
=== Television ===
Year	Title	Role	Director	Notes
2019	East Africa's Got Talent	Himself (judge)		Judge
2016 & 2018	NSSF Friends with Benefits	Himself (co-host)		Co-hosted with Crystal Newman
2014–2016	Beneath the Lies – The Series	Abe Sakku	Joseph Katsha Kyasi	TV series, Savannah MOON Productions
2010	Changes			
2006–2013	Tusker Project Fame	Himself (host)		Singing competition TV show
2018–2021	Another Round	Himself (co-host)		Lifestyle show on NBS TV

== Personal life ==
Kagwa married Enid Kushemeza in August 2009.

For most of his life, he has been an advocate of awareness and prevention of HIV/AIDS. In 2007, he was appointed as a UNAIDS special representative.
