= Malipenga =

African dance music of the Tonga people of Malawi

- Etymology: Trumpets
- Stylistic origins: military drills
- Cultural origins: After World War I, Nyasaland (current Malawi)

Malipenga is an African dance music of the Tonga people of Malawi. The dance was originated in imitations of military drills when they fought alongside the British Army in World War I.

Malipenga is common in the central and northern regions of Malawi, as in Tanzania, Mozambique, and Zambia with slight modifications. Each year in August is held a big Malipenga festival in Northern Malawi in a different town each year.

== History ==
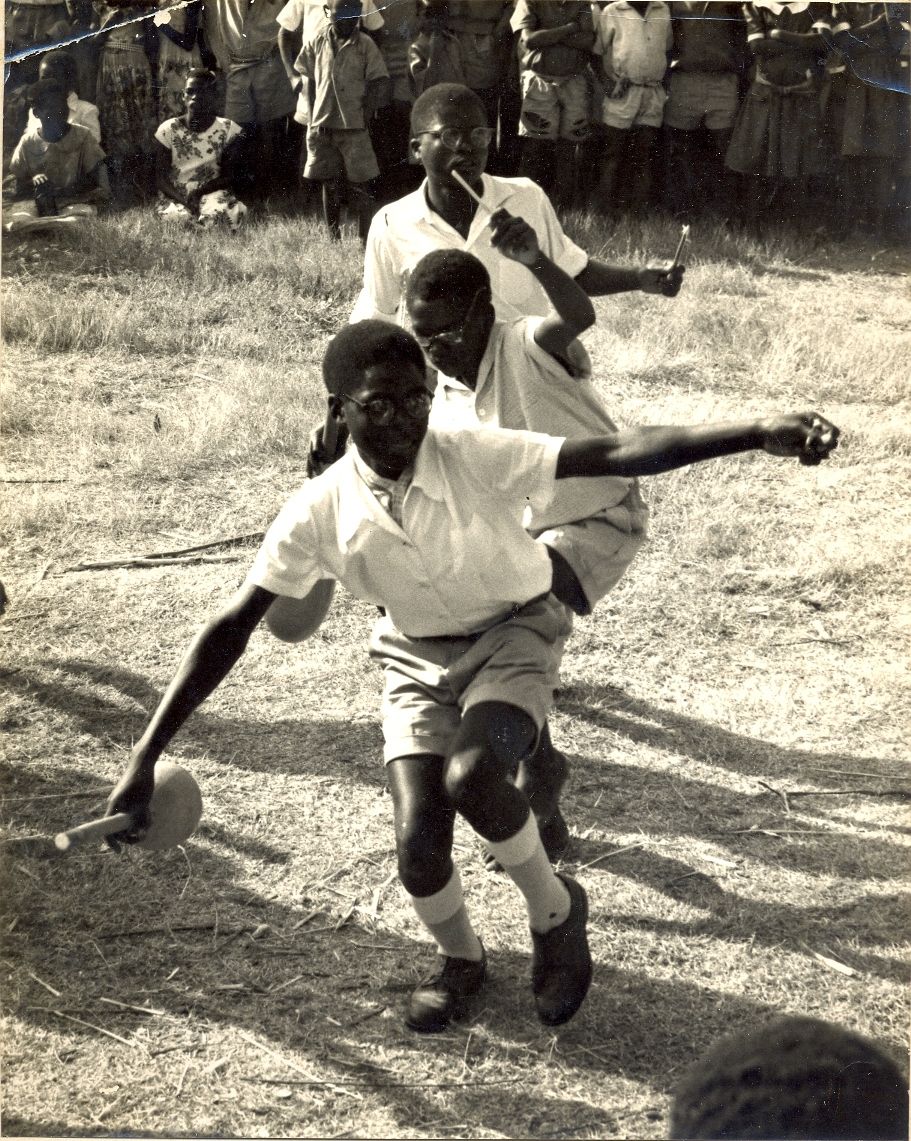
Malipenga dance from Malawi

First accounts of Malipenga dance were done after the end of the First World War. Its origins are linked to the system of military parades introduced by the British officers of the King's African Rifles that fought against the Germans.

Several studies consider malipenga as a variant of beni, like kalela and mganda. In Malawi, mganda and malipenga are names used interchangeably. In 1927, malipenga bands were accounted as "very numerous" through the Northern Province. Nyasa migrants carried their dances to the mines of Northern Rhodesia, Southern Rhodesia, Katanga, and Tanganyika under the name of mganda.

After the end of the war, the veterans that returned home adopted British military and administration terminology and formed "governments" called "bomas" in the form of a Malipenga dance movement, with a strong influence of military parades and bands.

Malipenga in Chitumbuka, Chitonga, and Cinyanja means "trumpets".

The location where dancing takes places is called "boma".

== See also ==
- African dance
- African music
- Bantu Music
