= Arthur Kwizera =

Ugandan anesthesiologist, Associate professor of Anaesthesiology

- Born: Uganda
- Education: Makerere University (Bachelor of Medicine and Bachelor of Surgery) (Master of Medicine in Anesthesiology and Critical Care); University of British Columbia (Fellowship in Anesthesiology); University of Cambridge (Doctor of Philosophy in Acute Respiratory Failure)
- Occupations: Anesthesiologist, intensivist
- Title: Associate professor of Anesthesiology and Intensive Care at Makerere University College of Health Sciences

Arthur Kwizera is a Ugandan anesthesiologist and intensivist, who serves as a senior lecturer in Anesthesiology and Critical Care at Makerere University College of Health Sciences. He also concurrently serves as staff intensivist at the Mulago National Referral Hospital intensive care unit. He is a member of the Ugandan Ministry of Health scientific advisory committee for COVID-19. He chairs the ad hoc committee, on research, based on evidence-based published global research, which informs the country's decisions regarding the pandemic.

== Background and education ==
Kwizera was born in Uganda, and attended local primary and secondary schools. After obtaining his high school diploma, he was admitted to Makerere University School of Medicine, the oldest in East Africa. He graduated from there with a Bachelor of Medicine and Bachelor of Surgery degree. After internship, he went back to Makerere and obtained a Master of Medicine degree in Anesthesiology and Critical Care. As of June 2020, Kwizera is pursuing a Doctor of Philosophy degree with joint supervision by Makerere University and the University of Cambridge in the United Kingdom. His PhD research focuses on acute respiratory failure and its treatment, particularly in low resource countries, like Uganda.

== Career ==
He is a university lecturer at the country's oldest medical school and an intensivist at the nation's highest tertiary referral hospital. He is a member of an international collaborative effort, to examine acute care in resource-limited settings with particular emphasis on sepsis management as well as anaesthesia and intensive care education. He served as the director of Public Relations and Communications at the Association of Anesthesiologists of Uganda (AAU) between 2015 and 2018.

== Other considerations ==
Kwizera is a member of the Ministry of Health's Infrastructure Committee, which sets up ICUs in Uganda's fifteen regional referral hospitals. He is tasked with recommending the proper equipment specifications and designing floor plans for the ICUs in these hospitals.

Kwizera chairs the National Intensive Care Committee tasked with developing the National Intensive Care Strategic Plan. The plan will guide the expansion of Uganda's intensive care capacity to at least 4,000 acute care beds. He and a team from the University of Cambridge are developing a ventilator to be used in hard-to-reach places.
