= Kwizera Arnold =

Rwandan journalist

Kwizera Arnold (born 24 September 1993) is a Rwandan journalist, and radio and television personality. Arnold is the CEO of Patriots Basketball Club, and of The K Financial, a financial media platform, where he is the host of Pivot and Profit, a podcast show including interviews with prominent African businesspeople. He is the co-founder and CEO of ArCa Ventures Fund and Studio. Arnold was formerly a presenter for CNBC Africa, a pan-African business news channel, a co-host of Kigali In The Morning, a radio breakfast show on Royal FM, and a former sports anchor of Rise and Shine Rwanda, a morning news show on Rwanda Television.

== Early life ==
Arnold was born in Westville, South Africa on 24 September, 1993. At age 2, he moved to Uganda to live with his mother. His father worked as a disc jockey. During his childhood, Arnold DJ'd at his friends' birthday celebrations.

At age 9, Arnold won the Baruda U-10 national badminton championship. He became the captain of his school's cricket team and a member of the football team.

After joining St. Mary's College Kisubi for high school, Arnold developed an affinity for rugby, and eventually became the youngest member of its rugby team, known as the Smack Eagles, playing as a scrumhalf. He transferred to St. Lawrence Paris Palais High School and captained the school's rugby team (the Mad Rhinos) to their first ever title and was voted most promising player. Arnold was part of the Ugandan Fifteens U-19 rugby team.

After completing secondary education, Arnold joined the Pirates, a local rugby club, where he played in the national league before suffering a career-ending knee injury.

He returned to Durban in South Africa to pursue economics at the University of KwaZulu-Natal.

== Career ==
Following his mother's death in 2012, Arnold returned to Rwanda where he worked as a co-host for a popular radio show, Ten Sports on Radio Ten as the first English-speaking sports show host in the country. In 2013, he moved to Radio Flash FM to co-host a weekly two-hour sports show.

On 1 October 2014, national broadcaster RTV announced a daily news breakfast show, titled Rise and Shine Rwanda, of which Arnold was set to be the sports news anchor. The show debuted on 15 October 2014.

In October 2015, he joined Royal FM, a Kigali-based radio station, where he presented the Royal Sports show every Saturday morning.

Arnold served as editor of Kigali Today, a local newspaper, and a sports editor at the Rwanda Focus newspaper. He co-hosts Kigali's most popular English breakfast show dubbed Kigali In The Morning on Royal Fm with Jackie Lumbasi.
