= Carol Alyek Beyanga =

Ugandan editor and media consultant

- Born: 1979
- Citizenship: Ugandan
- Education: Bachelor of Arts in social sciences; Masters of arts in journalism
- Occupation(s): Editor, journalist

Carol Alyek Beyanga (born 1979) is a Ugandan editor, journalist and media consultant. She is a member of the Uganda Editors Guild.

== Education ==
Carol holds a Bachelor of Arts in Social Sciences from Makerere University and a Masters of Arts in Journalism Studies from Cardiff University.

== Career ==
Carol Beyanga worked as a freelance editor and writer for the Sunrise newspaper and New Vision. In 2003, she joined the Daily Monitor, where she worked as a sub-editor, deputy features editor and special projects editor. In January 2015, Carol was appointed the managing editor of the Daily Monitor replacing Don Wanyama.

Carol has written and published many articles throughout her career.

== Personal life ==
Carol Beyanga is married with two children.

== See also ==
- Daily Monitor
- Samuel Sejjaaka
- Susan Nsibirwa
