= Canary Mugume =

Ugandan investigative journalist (born 1995)

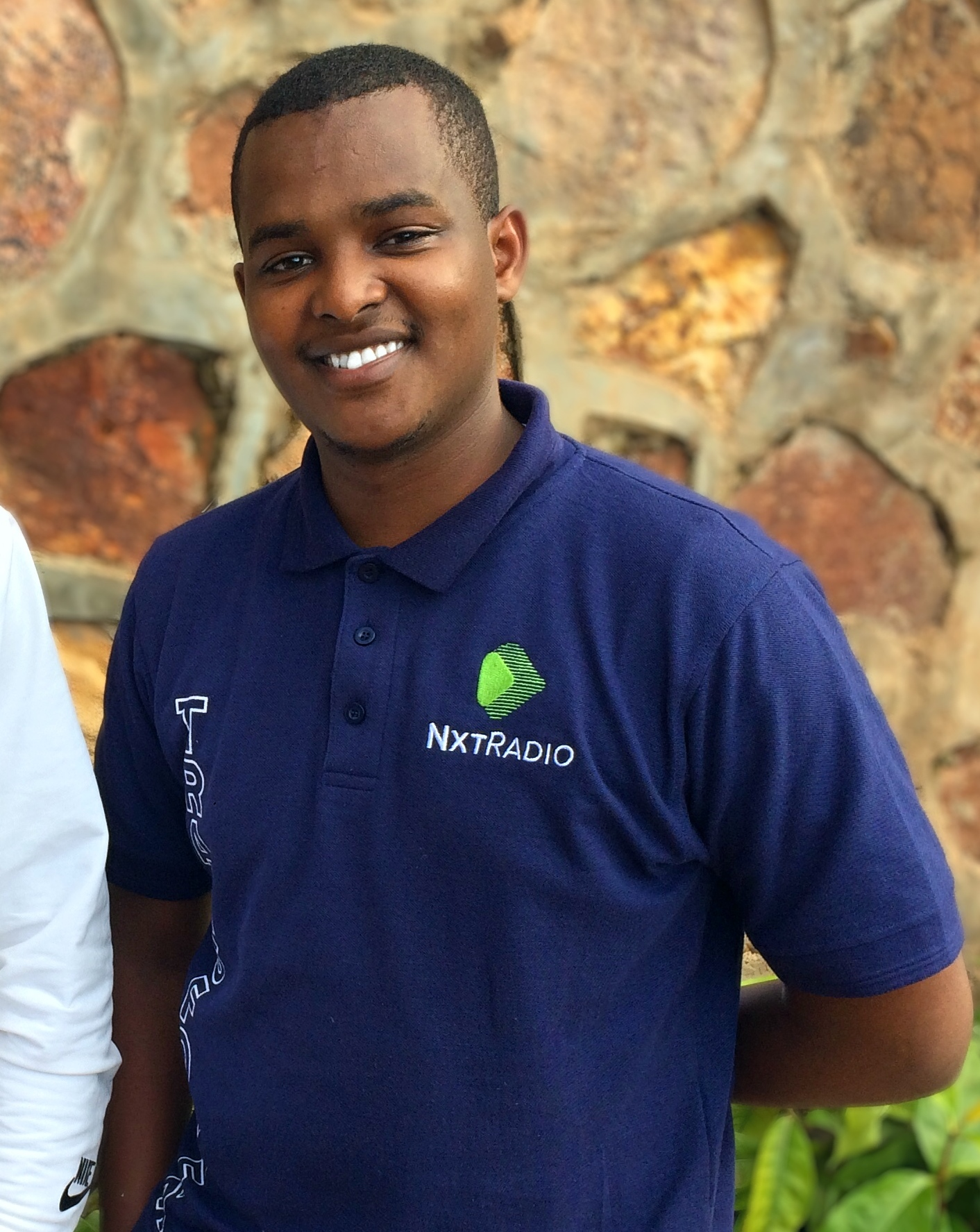
- Canary in 2020
- Born: Mbarara, Uganda
- Education: Bachelor of Information Technology
- Occupation: Journalist
- Years active: 2013–present

Canary Mugume is a Ugandan investigative journalist with NBS Television and a Léo Africa Young Emerging Leaders Program Fellow. His investigative reporting is specialized in current affairs, dysfunctions of the economy, and social matters.

== Early life ==
Mugume grew up in various parts of Mbarara, Uganda. He went to Mbarara Municipal Primary School for primary education, Mbarara Secondary School and Lutembe International School for secondary education. Mugume has a degree in information technology and computer engineering from the International University of East Africa. He also has a certificate in TV Production and Training from U.S. Agency for Global Media, a certificate in New Trends in Journalism from Institute for the advancement of journalism and a certificate in Digital Media Training from the U.S Agency for Global Media.

== Journalism career ==
Mugume started his journalism career at Radio West in Mbarara where he used to read news tailored for the interests of children six years old to thirteen years old. While at Mbarara high school he founded the school newspaper and later was given a platform to read the news during the school parade. He has also worked at Channel 44 and a trainee at Urban TV all in Uganda. He is currently the chief COVID-19 correspondent at NBS Television. He anchored the daily bulletin on coronavirus in 2019, and is also the host of the extended broadcast on coronavirus that airs every evening.

He is also the host of a Saturday political radio show on Nxt Radio titled "The Big Talk". He also writes a column in the Nile Post news portal every week titled ‘My Parting Shot.’

== Modelling ==
He is the CEO Version 86, fashion blogger and creative director at Fashion Republique. He has had training in modelling from Kat Modeling Agency, a Kenyan-based modelling agency. He was a nominee for upcoming male model at the Abryanz Style and Fashion Awards 2014.

== See also ==
- Josephine Namakumbi
- Solomon Serwanjja
