= Royal FM =

- Ilorin; Nigeria
- Broadcast area: Kwara State, Ekiti State, Kogi State, Oyo State, Niger State
- Frequency: 95.1 MHz

Ownership
- Owner: Gbenga Adebayo

History
- First air date: 12 December 2011

Links
- Website: royalfm.net

Royal FM (95.1 MHz) is a radio station in Ilorin Kwara State, Nigeria.

It was founded in 2011 by Gbenga Adebayo, a telecommunications engineer, and broadcast online before receiving final approval for FM operation later that year.
