= Kin Kariisa =

Ugandan businessman

- Born: 24 August 1976 (age 50); Rwengoma-Ruhaama, Ntungamo
- Occupation: Businessman
- Years active: 2000–present
- Organization: Next Media Services
- Website: kinkariisa.com

Kin Kariisa (born 24 August 1976) is a Ugandan media proprietor and philanthropist. He is the CEO of Next Media a home of 22 brands, a multimedia company in Uganda mostly known for its flagship television network NBS TV.

== Career ==
Kariisa started out as a barber in Mbarara Town before joining Makerere University, where he would later start developing web applications for a Danish company, Metrocomia Uganda Ltd. in 2000. He later quit Metrocomia to start his own company, Kin Systems, one of Uganda's first ICT companies. Courtesy of his success with Kin Systems, Kariisa was contacted by President Yoweri Kaguta Museveni to build a campaign system that would automatically send messages to mobile phones.

Kin would go on to be appointed Assistant Presidential Advisor on Information Communications and Technology (ICT).

Kariisa took over NBS TV in 2008 as CEO and grew it into Next Media, a multimedia company that runs eight television stations (NBS TV, Sanyuka TV, Salam TV, NBS Sport, NBS Sport 2, NBS Plus, NBS Music, NBS Music), 2 radio stations (Pulse Radio and Next Radio – formerly Jazz FM) in 2018, online news portal (Nile Post), digital communications agency and productions houses (Next Communications & Next Production). His radio station, Next Radio, is Uganda's pioneer audiovisual radio station.

Currently, Kin serves as Chairman of the Board of Trustees of National Association of Broadcasters (NAB), an umbrella industry association for all Television, Radio and Online broadcasters in Uganda.

In 2012, he was appointed director of Ecobank Uganda Limited, one of the largest banks in Africa for 7 years, and appointed chairman board of directors in 2019 for the "Pan African Bank."

He is also the Chairman Board of Directors for Nile Hotel International Ltd., the Government enterprise that owns Kampala Serena Hotel.

Kin also serves as the Chairman Board of Directors for Soliton Telmec, the leading telecommunications technology company in East Africa, supporting both the basic and complex infrastructure required to enable electronic communications across the region, which include data centers, fiber optic lines and related routing and transmission equipment.

== Personal life ==
Kin got married in 2004 to Julie Kariisa (Juliet Janat Tumusiime) and together, the couple has three children. Jamila Kariisa, Kin Kariisa Jr. and Shaka Kariisa. He is a muslim.

== Recognition ==
He was named among the most influential Ugandans in 2019 in a survey conducted by Public Opinions International, a Pan African Organisation.
