= Karitas Karisimbi =

Ugandan radio and television personality

Karitas Karisimbi (born 26 May 1974) is a Ugandan radio host, television presenter and producer of reality TV shows. She is currently working with the Next Media Services.

Karisimbi did a journalism course in Nairobi and an information technology course in the United Kingdom.

She once worked at WBS TV hosting the show called Time Magazine.
