= Lillian Mbabazi =

Rwandan-Ugandan musician (born 1984)

- Born: 28 August 1984 (age 42); Uganda
- Education: Makerere University
- Occupations: Musician, Radio Presenter
- Musical career
- Genres: Pop; R&B; World; Soul
- Years active: 2003–present
- Label: Deuces Entertainment Group

Lillian Mbabazi (born 28 August 1984) is a Rwandan-Ugandan recording artist and entertainer. She was a member the Ugandan girls music group the Blu*3. In 2014, she was one of the featured artists in the second season of Coke Studio Africa.

== Early life and career ==
She was born in Uganda to Rwandan Parents. According to a Ugandan publicist at Bryan Morel Publications, Lilian's music style is neo-soul associated with R&B Band tendencies.

=== Music ===
Mbabazi began performing professionally in 2003, after the Coca-Cola Pop Star competitions that led to the formation of Blu*3. She found musical success with the group, winning the Best Artist/Group from Uganda & Best Music Video from Uganda in the 2005 Kisima Music Awards, Video of the Year ("Hitaji") in the 2005 Pearl of Africa Music Awards

She also won Video of the Year ("Burrn") in the 2007 Pearl of Africa Music Awards and was nominated for best East African Group in the 2005 at the Kora Awards. She won the Best East African Album (Hitaji) award in the 2005 Tanzania Music Awards and the Best East African Video ("Frisky") in the 2006 at the Channel O Music Video Awards.

In 2010, she was nominated among the Best East African Song (Where you are with Radio & Weasel) in the 2010 Tanzania music awards and in 2009, she was nominated among the Best Group & Best Performer in 2009 at the 2009 MTV Africa Music Awards.

In 2010, she embarked on a solo career and has had successful songs like "Vitamin" with Weasel of the duo Goodlyfe Crew, "Kawa" and "Danger". She has collaborated with Goodlyfe Crew, Navio, AY, P-Unit and Kitoko.

In 2016, Mbabazi won her first accolade at the HiPipo Music Awards for her Memories duet with A Pass.

In 2022, she released the One Ep which featured her latest work and collaborations.

=== Radio ===
Mbabazi started working at 91.3 Capital FM, one of the leading FM radio stations in Uganda, after the departure of their Big Breakfast co-host Karitas Karisimbi back in the 2000s. She, however, left the station to concentrate on her music career right before the disintegration of Blu*3 and was replaced at the station with Jackie Lumbasi. She later joined City Radio

== Personal life ==
Mbabazi was in a relationship with the late musician Mowzey Radio (25 January 1985 – 1 February 2018), with whom she had two children. The couple had supposedly been together since their time at Makerere University, before their break up a few months into 2015. After the couple got their first child, they faced a number of issues that eventually led to the break up.

== See also ==
- List of Ugandan musicians
