= Solomon Serwanjja =

Ugandan journalist (born 1982) and politician

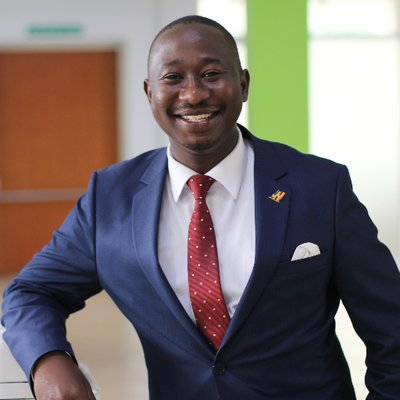
- Born: 18 September 1982 (age 44); Entebbe
- Education: Makerere University
- Spouse: Vivian Serwanjja
- Children: Four
- Awards: Komla Dumar Award

Solomon Serwanjja is a Ugandan investigative journalist and the Executive Director of the African Institute for Investigative Journalism (AIIJ). On 13 July 2021, he resigned from his position as news anchor with NBSTV ending his 13 year career on television. In 2019 Serwanjja was awarded the Komla Dumor Award, an annual award given by the BBC to celebrate African journalists. He holds a master's degree in journalism and communication from Makerere University.

== Life and career ==
Serwanjja is a United Nations Reham al-Farra Memorial Journalism fellow 2018, and has worked as a news anchor and reporter for several television stations in East Africa including NBS TV, KTN News, NTV Uganda, UBC TV.

Serwanjja is married to Vivian Serwanjja and they have four children: Amani, Imani, Upendo and Asante.

In 2026 Sserwanja ventured into politics and contested for the Local Council I chairperson seat for Bamutakudde Village in Mukono district. He was declared winner after defeating his closet rival with a one vote margin.

== Awards ==
- BBC Komla Dumor Award 2019
- Journalist of the Year 2017 - ACME AWARD
- Post 2015 UN Award (Broadcast Category)

== See also ==
- Josephine Namakumbi
- Canary Mugume
