= Arthur Nkusi =

Rwandan media personality (born 1991)

Nkusi Arthur
- Born: 22 January 1991 (age 35); Uganda
- Other name: Rutura
- Education: University of Essex
- Occupations: Founder & Creative Director at Arthur Nation | Campaigner | Artist
- Years active: 2004 - present
- Known for: Radio & Comedy
- Spouse: Ntarindwa Fiona Muthoni

Nkusi Arthur (born 22 January 1991), commonly known as Arthur or Rutura, is a Rwandan entrepreneur, comedian, actor, media personality, and campaigner. He is the founder of Arthur Nation Ltd, where he serves as creative director.

Arthur Nkusi has worked with numerous organisations as a creative director, campaigner and communication expert like Vivo Energy Rwanda, LEGO Foundation, Unicef Rwanda, UNFPA Rwanda, Tax justice Network Africa, Irembo, NIDA, Jambo Jet, European Union in Rwanda and many more.

Arthur is a former Big Brother Africa housemate, where he represented Rwanda alongside Frank Rukundo in the 9th season of the show. He is also a popular standup comedian in Rwanda.

As a comedian, Nkusi has performed with comedians like BasketMouth, Eddie Kadi, MC Jessy, Daniel Omara, and Patrick Salvador in popular comedy shows like Comedy Store Uganda, the Churchill Show, Seka Live, and Africa Laughs and Seka Fest.

== Early life and career ==
Arthur was born in Uganda on 22 January 1991, to his father, Mpazimpaka Kennedy, and his mother Harriet Kibuuka. Arthur attended the La Colombiere primary school and received his secondary education at Lycee de Kigali. He later attended the University of Rwanda for his Agriculture degree but later dropped to pursue Media and creative directions. Arthur now holds a master's degree in global digital marketing from the University of Essex in England.

=== Comedy ===
Arthur's comedy career began in 2009 when he co-founded a comedy group known as the comedy knights. Since then, he has performed with many popular African comedians, including Anne Kansime, BasketMouth, Eddie Kadi, MC Jessy, Daniel Omara, Patrick Salvador, Uncle Mark, Eric Omondi, Alex Muhangi, MC Mariachi, Teacher Mpamire, Akite Agnes, and Jemimah Sanyu. Arthur is currently hosting "Seka live" a monthly comedy show in Rwanda and an annual festival called "Seka Fest".

=== Filmography ===
At the age of 14, Arthur Nkusi was featured in a film titled Beyond the Gates, which was directed by Michael Caton-Jones. He later appeared in Shake Hands With the Devil, Volunteers, The Missing Pillar films, and The City Dropout.

=== Broadcasting ===
Arthur's radio presenting career begun in 2012, when he was hired by Nation Media Group at KFM radio. He presented the evening program Rush Hour with the Double A. He worked there until 2015, before joining Kiss FM, where he worked for seven years before retiring from radio broadcasting to pursue other interests.

== Personal life ==
Arthur is married to Ntarindwa Fiona Muthoni, a producer and presenter at CNBC Africa.

== See also ==
- Comedy Store Uganda
- 14th Africa Movie Academy Awards
- Big Brother Africa (season 9)
- List of Africa Movie Academy Awards ceremonies
