= Comedy Store Uganda =

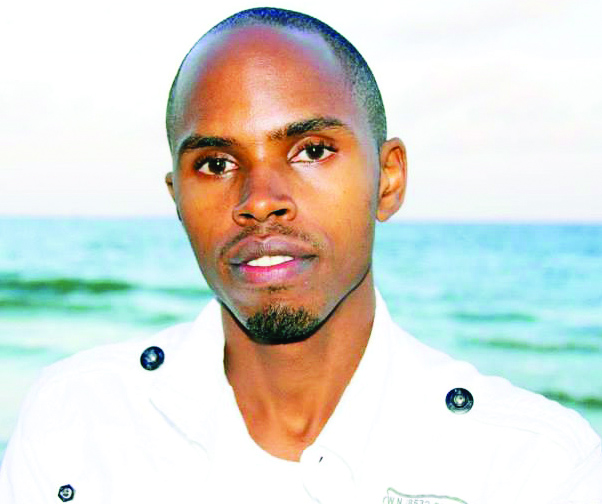
- Genre: Comedy, Reality Show
- Created by: Alex Muhangi
- Directed by: Alex Muhangi
- Starring: Alex Muhangi; Salvado; Teacher Mpamire; Akite Agnes; Uncle Mark; Arthur Nkusi; Jemimah Sanyu; Jay K. Mulungi
- Country of origin: Uganda
- Original languages: English, Luganda

Production
- Executive producer: Alex Muhangi
- Producer: Alex Muhangi
- Production locations: Diners' Lounge Bukoto; The 400 Bar and Restaurant Bukoto; UMA Main Exhibition Hall Lugogo (Current)
- Camera setup: Multiple-camera setup
- Running time: 6 Hours live, 30 Minutes TV

Original release
- Network: NTV Uganda
- Release: May 5, 2016

Comedy Store Uganda (sometimes just Comedy Store or Comedy Store Ug), is a weekly live stand-up comedy show that was created in 2016 by comedian Alex Muhangi, who is also the host since the show’s inception. The show is recorded on Wednesdays at UMA Multi-Purpose Hall Lugogo in Kampala and airs Fridays on NTV Uganda.

Comedy Store premiered at Diner's Lounge in Bukoto in May 2016, moved to The 400 Bar in October 2017, and in January 2018, the show moved to UMA Main Exhibition Hall in Lugogo. In 2022, After the covid pandemic the show moved to UMA Multi-purpose hall and os held every Wednesday.

== Overview ==
The show featured a live band, comedy performances, talent showcases, and celebrity musicians’ performances. The show opened with the red carpet and Alex Muhangi interviewed the day’s performers and celebrity guests.

The Undercover Brothers Ug and The Kava Band were the regular live performers in 2017, Jemimah Sanyu with her Unit 446 band in 2018

Comedians from Uganda and the rest of Africa performed at Comedy Store including Eric Omondi from Kenya, Arthur Nkusi from Rwanda, and many others.

Every episode of the show ended with a performance from a guest musician, and since the shows' inception in 2016, it featured; Bebe Cool, Sheebah Karungi, Bobi Wine, Cindy, Navio, Maddox Ssematimba, Jose Chameleone, Juliana Kanyomozi, Eddy Kenzo, Nameless, Afrigo Band and others.

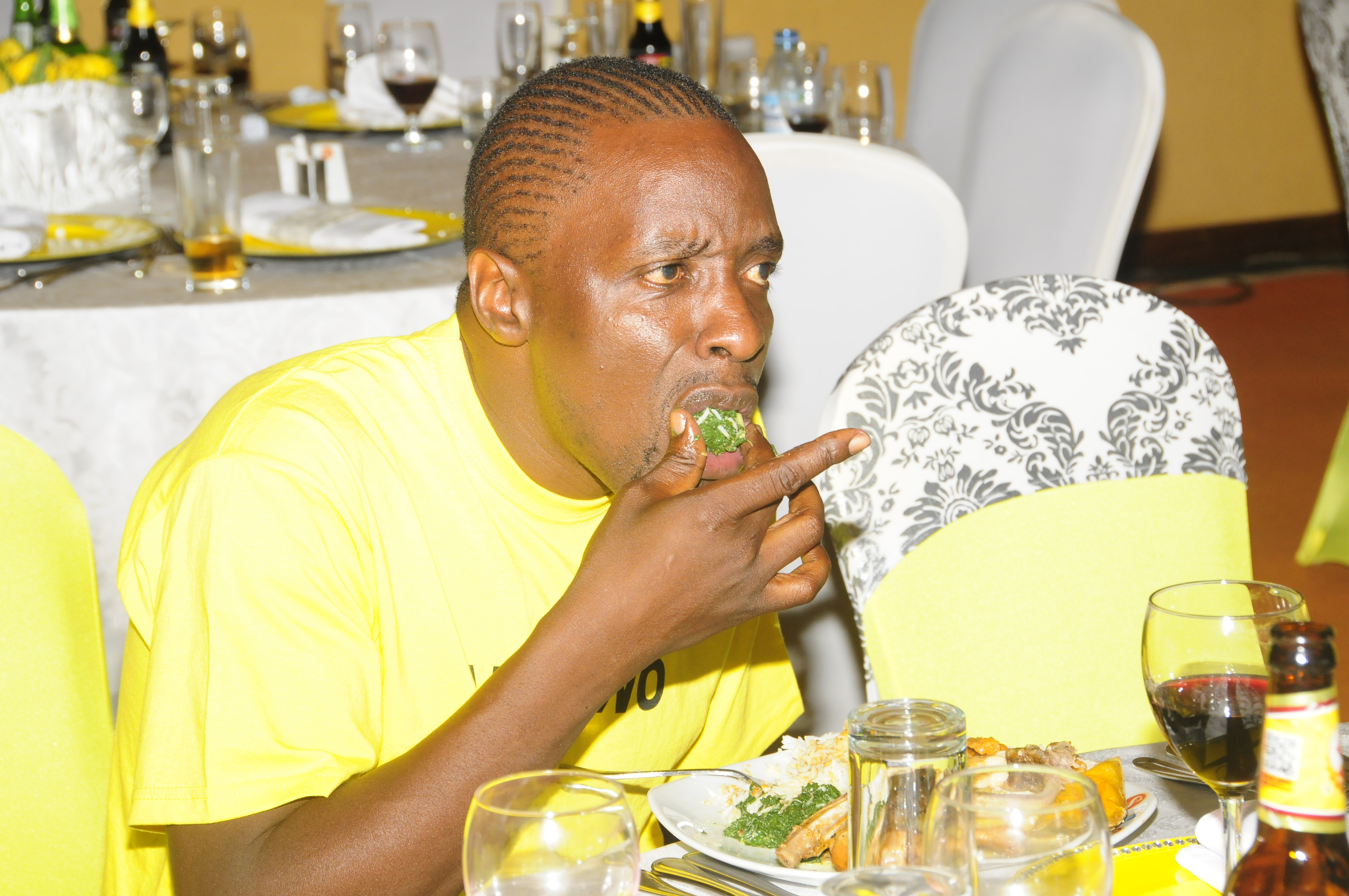

In 2019, the show awarded its best comedians who were some of the regulars on the show. MC Mariachi won the Best Comedian, Madrat & Chiko won Best Comedy Duo, Mighty Family won Best Upcoming Comedian(s), Maulana and Reign won the Fans’ Choice Award, Bizonto won Best Comedy Group, Amooti Omubalanguzi won Legendary Comedian Award and Senga Justine Nantume Outstanding Performance Act.

The show also introduced a segment called The Chill under the lockdown edition called Stress Clinic, where comedians discuss news that made headlines in Uganda in the previous week, with a dose of comedy.

== Cast ==
Some of the comedians that have performed at Comedy Store Uganda are;

- Alex Muhangi
- Salvado
- MC Mariachi
- Teacher Mpamire
- Akite Agnes
- Cotilda Inapo
- Uncle Mark
- Madrat and Chiko
- MC Kapale
- Jaja Bruce
- Eric Omondi
- Afande Kelekele
- Godi Godi
- Kabaata
- Arthur Nkusi

== Themes ==
The show's performers tackle different themes ranging from politics, love, family, life in Kampala, and more. Some performers just engage the live audience in wordplay, others perform skits as some tell stories and others perform satirical pieces against the politics and politicians in the country and worldwide.

== Filming ==
Regular filming of the show started at Diner's Lounge in Bukoto in May 2016, moved to The 400 Bar in October 2017, and in January 2018, the show moved to UMA Main Exhibition Hall in Lugogo until the Covid19 pandemic when it moved to Levels Lounge in Kitante until 2022. The set was returned to UMA Lugogo in 2022. The show has also been filmed in Mbarara and a few other places around the country.
