= Watoto =

Watoto may refer to:

- Watoto Church, a Pentecostal church based in Kampala, Uganda
- Watoto Child Care Ministries, a child care organization run by the Watoto Church
- Watoto Children's Choir, a children's choir made up of children from the Watoto Child Care Ministries
