= Arise Woman! Comedy Jam =

Ugandan stand-up comedy show

- Status: Active
- Genre: Stand-up Comedy
- Date: March 8, 2019
- Frequency: Annually
- Venue: National Theatre Uganda
- Location: Kampala
- Country: Uganda
- Years active: 7
- Inaugurated: March 8, 2019
- Founder: Akite Agnes
- Attendance: 377
- Leader: Akite Agnes
- Organiser: Timothy Nyanzi
- Sponsor: Tusker Malt Lager Uganda, MyHQ, Coca-Cola (Century Bottling Company), Bella Wine,

Arise Woman! Comedy Jam is a Ugandan stand-up comedy show created and hosted by Akite Agnes. The event happens annually on International Women's Day in celebration of the achievements of the woman in the society and has an all female cast. The show takes place yearly on 8 March. Proceeds from each show go to an identified Charity organisation

== Arise Woman!2019 ==
Arise Woman!2019 is the maiden comedy show of the annual event. Proceeds from this show went to help Home of Hope Uganda (https://www.homeofhopeuganda.org/). The show took place in Theatre Labonita and it comprised an all female star cast.

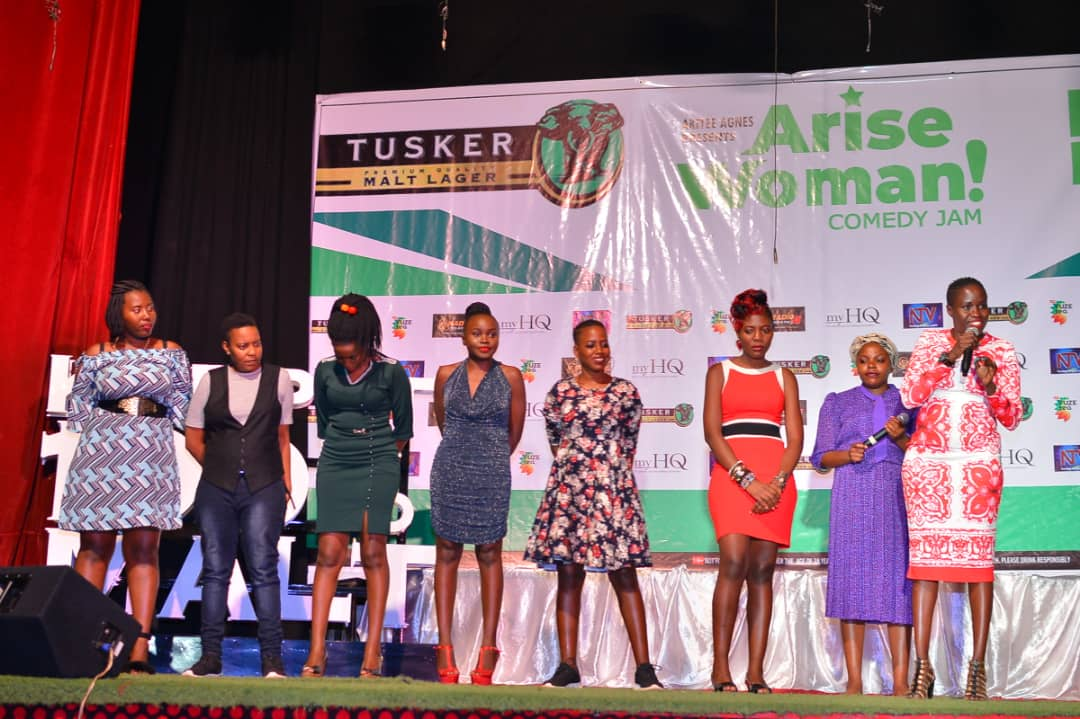
Ladies who performed on the first Arise Woman! Comedy Jam. L-R: Dorah Nakagwa, Sheila Katamba, Flower Girl, Titin, Rich Mouth, Maggie Nansubuga, Nancy Kobusheshe, Akite Agnes

=== Performers in Arise Woman!2019 Comedy Jam ===
- Akite Agnes (host)
- Fun Factory Ladies
- Nancy Kobusheshe
- Maggie Nansubuga
- Leila Kachapizo
- Dora Nakaga
- Rich Mouth
- Flower Girl
- Sheila Katamba
