= Kenneth Pablo Kimuli =

Ugandan comedian, playwright and journalist

Kenneth Kimuli
- Born: 23 September 1978 (age 48); Mbale, Uganda
- Education: Namasagali University (B.A mass media, journalism and creative writing)
- Occupations: Journalist; comedian; playwright
- Years active: 2003–present
- Known for: Stand up comedy as Pablo

Kenneth Kimuli Amooti (born 23 September 1978) is a Ugandan comedian, playwright and journalist. He is known as Pablo in Ugandan comedy circles. He won the first Multi-Choice Stand Up Uganda comedy competition. After losing both parents to HIV/AIDS at an early age, he has formed the charity organisations Pill Power Uganda and Tangaza Arts Centre which aim to support young people living with HIV/AIDS.

== Early life ==
Kimuli was born on 23 September 1978 in Mbale to Stephen Isingoma and Enid Kirungi Katungwensi Isingoma. He was the seventh born in a family of nine children. He went to Macknon Kindergarten, Kampala in his nursery, then joined Shimoni Demonstration Primary School.

In 1988, Kimuli's father died of HIV/AIDS. After this the family relocated to Mbarara where he continued his primary schooling in Boma Primary School and later on Bweranyangi Primary School where he took his Primary Leaving Examinations in 1993. In that same year, when he was 14 years old, he lost his mother to HIV/AIDS. Due to having lost both parents, the children were distributed to be taken care of by different relatives who were living in Masindi, Mbarara and Kabarole districts. Kimuli's maternal uncle Stephen Isingoma and his wife Joan Musiime Mushagara became his guardians.

He continued his education in Mbarara High School where he sat his UCE in 1997 and later on UACE in 1999. Kimuli then attended Namasagali University, acquiring a bachelor's degree in Mass Media, Journalism and Creative Writing in 2003

== Career ==
=== Journalism ===
After graduation, in 2003, Kimuli looked for a job but failed to get one. He tried writing articles for newspapers which were not accepted. He then started his own Newspaper called Vanguard that went out of business within six months.

In 2004, he joined the Daily Monitor newspaper, where he was a freelance journalist. He worked with the newspaper until 2008.

He was a radio presenter with Power FM 104.1 in 2004. This is where he acquired the Pablo name. He stopped working with the radio station in 2009.

Between 2006 and 2013 Kimuli was Productions Director of a radio drama called Rock Point 256.

In 2009, he joined The Observer Newspaper as a humour columnist.

=== Comedy ===
Kimuli attributes his comedy to his parents who he says were "humourists of their generation." While at Mbarara High School, he stood for Food Prefect as a joke and he won which he later explained was when he knew he should do comedy.

In 2004, he was assigned by the Daily Monitor newspaper to write an article on Theatre Factory. Afterwards, he kept going back to watch them during rehearsals, giving them tips. This led to him being invited to join the group in 2005.

In 2007, he was invited by Robert Redford to the Sundance Theatre Program in the United States where he shared the stage with celebrated film actors and actresses.

In 2009, he won the MultiChoice Stand Up Uganda competition including $10,000 of prize money. He later started his own weekly show called Pablo Live after leaving Theatre Factory. Later on the show was changed to the last Friday of every month. After eight years of Pablo Live, it closed in 2016 before reopening almost a year later in 2017.

in February 2010, Kimuli performed at the Comedy Club Live in Lagos, Nigeria. In November, he performed at the Comedy Club Live in Mombasa, Kenya

In 2012, he performed in the Nights of 1000 Laughs in Kampala.

In 2013, he launched a live show called Pablo and the Continental Comedian. This show featured different comedians brought from different parts of Africa including Chibwe Katebe from Zambia, Allan Bloo and Mandy Uzonitsha from Nigeria,

In 2016 he was nominated in the World's Funniest Comedian competition.

Kimuli has mentored other comedians joining the industry, including Teacher Mpamire, and has inspired others such as Ronnie McVex to start doing comedy. Through his Pablo Live Comfort Clinic, new comedians including Gocher were able to get started in comedy. Comedian Patrick Salvador Idringi attributes the "[lifting] of the [Ugandan] comedy industry from scratch" to Kimuli and Amooti Omubaranguzi.

In 2019 he was named as one of the highest paid comedians in Uganda

==== Genre of Comedy ====
Mainly observational comedy and satire.

=== Hosting ===
In 2016, he hosted the Qwela Christmas party held by Qwela Junction.

In 2017, together with Anne Kansiime, he co-hosted a music show by Oliver Mtukudzi in the "Lockdown Show."

=== Politics ===
in October 2020, Kimuli was nominated to stand as a candidate in the 2021 Ugandan general election for Bunyangabu District.

== Charity Work ==
In 2013, he organised a fete called "Comedy Meets Music" that attracted artists, including Zambian gospel singer Pompi, to raise money to help spread information about HIV/AIDS. In 2014, he organised another Comedy Meets Music show which attracted more than 10 comedians including Dr. Ofweneke from Kenya and 10 musicians. Proceeds from this show support went to the Zip up 256 HIV/Aids prevention campaign

In 2013, Kimuli founded the Zip Up campaign aimed at young people to fight HIV/AIDS.. In 2014, Kimuli partnered with Uganda AIDS Commission in the Zip up 256 campaign which aimed to reach out to "schools and universities using entertainment and testimonies by youth infected with the virus" .

In 2015, he formed an organisation called Pill Power Uganda which he runs, together with youth living and affected by HIV/AIDS. where he mentors people living with HIV/AIDs

He formed another charity, Tangaza Arts Centre, in 2016 which helps young people living with HIV/AIDS develop life skills. Tebere Art Centre was also formed in the same year.
In 2009, during Easter weekend, together with Power FM, he participated in a reach-out program to the prisoners in Luzira Maximum Security Prison that included performing stand-up comedy and interactions.

In 2016, he partnered with Reach A Hand Uganda to sensitize and raise awareness among student leaders and teachers from over 10 different secondary schools on matters concerning HIV/AIDS.

== Personal life ==
Kimuli is married to Karen Hasahya, a former Miss Ugandan contestant and Miss Talent 2003. They met on 24 October 2009 in church. He proposed to her on 14 February 2010 and they got married on 4 September 2010 by Pastor Gary Skinner of Watoto Church. Together they have two children.

Kimuli, originally an Anglican, is a Born again Christian. Having been a heavy drinker and smoker, he quit after he turned on the television and heard Joyce Meyer preaching.

Kimuli is a Rotarian with Rotary Club of Kampala North.

== Stage ==
Production	Year(s)	Theatre	Role(s)	Notes	Ref.
Lwanda Magere	2001	National Theatre			
Prologue in Heaven					
One Night Stand	2006		Writer		
Buried in The Dark	2006		Director		
Madness is Coming	2008		Writer		
The Adams					
Samuel Buckett's Plays					

== Awards ==
Year	Nominated work	Category	Award	Result	Notes	Ref.
2008	Buzz Teeniez Awards		Best Television Personality	Won		
2009	Multichoice Stand Up Uganda		King of Comedy	Won	First Runner up – Patrick Salvador Idringi; Second runner up – Daniel Omara	
2009	Buzz Teeniez Awards		Best Television Personality	Won		
2010	New Vision Publication Readers Opinion Poll		Best local actor	Won		
2012	Edutainment Awards		Best performing artist	Won		
2013	Ugandan Social Media awards	Entertainment	Best Entertainment Writer	Nominated		
2013	Young Achievers Awards	Performing Arts	Outstanding Performing Arts Award	Won		
2016	Laugh Factory		Funniest person in the world	Nominated		
2018	TITANS: Building Nations CEO Global Awards	Arts and Media	Country winner in Great Lakes Region	Won		
2018	TITANS: Building Nations CEO Global Awards	Arts and Media	Regional winner in Great Lakes Region	Won		
2018	TITANS: Building Nations CEO Global Awards	Arts and Media	Continental Award	Nominated		
