= Hannington Bugingo =

Ugandan comedian, actor, and film producer (born 1981)

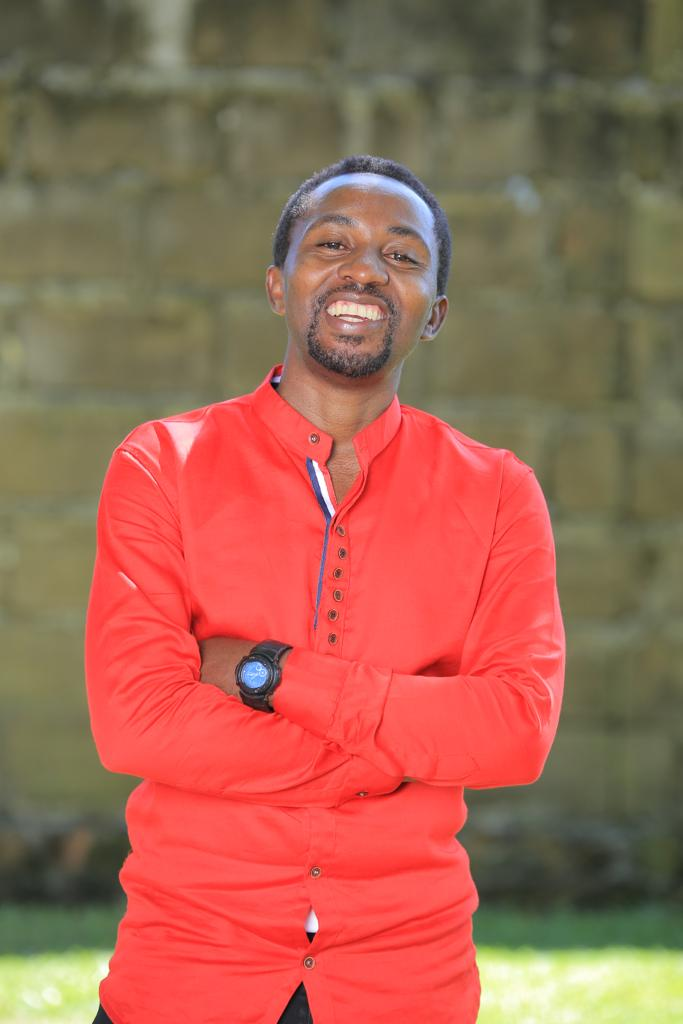
- Bugingo in 2019
- Born: 12 May 1981; Kampala, Uganda
- Education: Makerere University (BA Drama)
- Occupations: Comedian; actor; film producer; advertising strategist
- Years active: 2003–present
- Known for: Mizigo Express
- Spouse: Esther Mirembe Bugingo (m. 2009)
- Children: 4

Hannington Bugingo (born 12 May 1981) is a Ugandan comedian, actor, film producer, and advertising strategist. He is the managing director of Fun Factory Uganda and also the founding president of the Uganda Comedians Association. He is known for his role as Sam in Mizigo Express and also portrays various characters in Fun Factory's Comedicine.

== Early life and education ==
Hannington Bugingo was born 12 May 1981 at Mengo Hospital in Kampala, Uganda to Charles Bafakuleka Mwebaze, a reverend, and Ruth Nakate, a businesswoman. The last-born in a family of five, Bugingo attended Namalemba Mixed Day and Boarding School, Busembatya, Iganga, then St. Leo's College, Kyegobe, Fort Portal for his O-levels, and later went to Lubiri Secondary School for his A-levels. Afterward, he joined Makerere University, where he pursued and completed a Bachelor of Arts in Drama

== Career ==
=== Early work ===
Towards his second year of university, Bugingo went to Mbale to do his practical exams. "We were performing a play titled The Bear and I was the lead actor. The audience applauded me quite a lot. They were impressed with my acting so I convinced myself that I could act." It was after the play that his then-lecturer, Philip Luswata, approached him and suggested the idea of forming a theatre group. When they went back to Kampala, Bugingo, together with Phillip Luswata, Kwezi Kaganda, Farouq Twesigye, Frobisha Lwanga, Faith Kimuli, and Julius Lugaya met and formed Theatre Factory. The group's first performance was in mid-September 2003 in front of only fifteen people, comprising the owner and staff members of his workplace. Initially, they were paid with a meal of plain chips only because the owner said he had invested in that project and didn't have money to pay them.

=== 2006–2009 ===
In 2006, Bugingo acted as the Minister of Health's bodyguard in The Last King of Scotland, starring Forest Whitaker and Kerry Washington. In the same year, he acted as Ragos in a short film called Roho alongside Lupita Nyong'o.

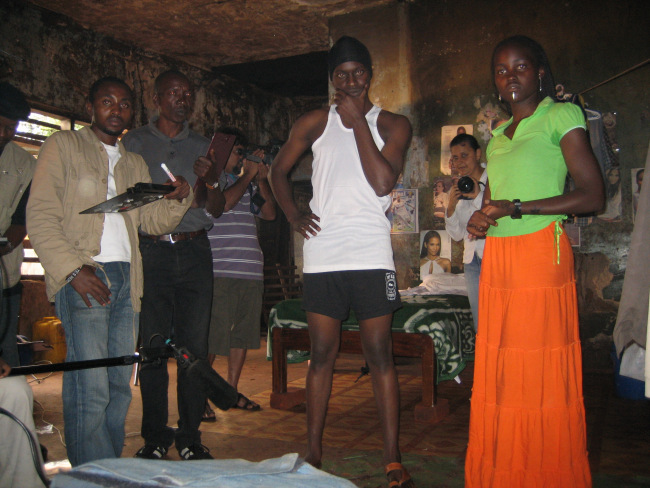
On the set of Roho. L–R: Hannington Bugingo, Ayub, Sam Ibanda, Lupita Nyong'o

In 2008, Bugingo acted in Kiwani as Kaggwa beside Juliana Kanyomozi. Together with Henry H Ssali, he also co-directed the movie. While still with Theatre Factory, he joined Scanad Uganda Limited, an advertising agency, in 2008. He worked there until 2011, when Metropolitan Republic headhunted him as a copy writer. It was during this time that Bugingo won a bronze medal with Metropolitan Republic at the Loerie Awards for the MTN SIM card registration campaign.

=== 2010–2019 ===
In January 2010, Bugingo, together with thirteen other members, after a disagreement with the administration of Theatre Factory, broke away and formed a new group called Fun Factory Uganda. He became its general manager.

In 2013, Bugingo quit his job as a creative strategist at Metropolitan Republic to concentrate on Fun Factory Uganda and the advertising agency that he and his friends had opened, called KIB Marketing and Advertising Agency.

In 2015, he produced the film Situka. "The project, meant to encourage youths to 'stand up' (Situka) for their rights, think of the future...is a story that covers the entire country, Africa, and the globe".

In January 2019, the government of Uganda proposed a bill suggesting every artist should be registered under the Ministry of Gender, Labour and Social Development. According to the bill, every artist would have to obtain authorization from the ministry before shooting a video. Bugingo had this to say about it: "We are not trying to fight the government; neither are we saying that all points highlighted in the bill are wrong. But as artistes, we were not represented well. Our biggest problems are not performing for more than two hours or drugs, but copyright. The government will definitely earn much if they pass this bill, but what is in it for us artistes?"

In February 2019, the Uganda Comedians Association (TUCA) was formed, and Bugingo was elected as its founding president, while promising to wipe out vulgarity from the comedy industry.

=== 2020–present ===
In 2020, Bugingo raised money to launch the career of up-and-coming artist Razor Blade Lutabalala.

Bugingo was appointed a member of the board of trustees of the Uganda National Cultural Centre in April 2024.

Bugingo's tenure as president of TUCA ended in November 2025, when Alex Muhangi was elected to the position.

== Political involvement ==
Bugingo has been actively involved in political storytelling and activism through film and media. In 2015, he produced Situka, a politically charged film starring Robert Kyagulanyi Ssentamu (Bobi Wine) that promotes youth empowerment and civic responsibility. He also produced Da Ghetto President, a reality TV show on Bukedde TV that provided insight into Bobi Wine's personal and political life.

In May 2025, it was reported that Bugingo faced increased surveillance and threats due to his association with Bobi Wine. Authorities were allegedly monitoring communications of individuals connected to the entertainer and politician over the past decade. Bugingo's outspoken social media posts, critical of the government, have drawn accusations of producing content intended to tarnish the government's image.

== Personal life ==
Bugingo, or "Bujju", as he is commonly known in the comedy industry, married Esther Mirembe Bugingo on 18 September 2009. His wife works for the Bank of Africa.

In March 2019, Bugingo was inducted into the Rotary Club of Kampala Munyonyo.

== Filmography ==
=== Film ===
List of film appearances, with year, title, and role shown
Year	Title	Role	Notes
2006	The Last King of Scotland	Bodyguard	Bodyguard to the Minister of Health
2006	Roho	Ragos	Weed seller who witnesses a murder
2008	Kiwani: The Movie	Kaggwa	Pickpocket and conman
2008		Co-producer	Together with Henry H Ssali
2015	Situka	Executive producer	

=== Television ===
List of television appearances, with year, title, and role shown
Year	Title	Role	Notes	Tv network
2010–2015	U-Turn	Various roles		NTV
2015–2017	U-Turn	Various roles		NBS
2018–present	Mizigo Express	Sam	Tenant and sidekick to Kabogozza, the landlord	Pearl Magic (DStv)
