= The Comedy Store (disambiguation) =

The Comedy Store is a comedy club in West Hollywood, California, United States, opened in 1972.

(The) Comedy Store may also refer to:

- The Comedy Store (London), a comedy club in London, England, UK, opened in 1979
- The Comedy Store, Sydney, a venue for stand-up comics in Sydney, Australia, opened in 1981
- The Comedy Store (TV series), a 2020 documentary miniseries about the American Comedy Store
- Comedy Store Uganda, a weekly live stand-up comedy show on television

== See also ==
- The Comedy Store Players, a group of improv comics who perform at The Comedy Store in London
- Ha-Comedy Store, an Israeli entertainment program broadcast 1994-1996
- Tokyo Comedy Store, an English-language comedy show held at various venues in central Tokyo, Japan
