= Aaliyah Nanfuka =

Ugandan actress (born 1986)

- Born: 25 August 1986 (age 39); Butambala District, Uganda
- Occupation: Actress
- Years active: 2008–present
- Known for: Film and television presentation
- Children: 2
- Parents: Ahmed Nampagi Kayingo (father); Noor Namubiru Abdul (mother)

Aaliyah Nanfuka (born 25 August 1986) is a Ugandan actress, playwright, creative, director and producer active since 2008.

== Background ==
She was born on 25 August 1986 and raised in a Muslim family. Her father is Ahmed Nampagi Kayingo and her mother is Noor Namubiru Abdul from Butambala District. Nanfuka is the first born in a family of five children. Nanfuka completed her primary education at Lwamasaka Primary School Ngando in Butambala district and achieved a primary leaving certificate from Uganda National Examinations Board. She later attended Kitagobwa Secondary School and completed her ordinary certificate of education in 2004. She then attended Blue Nile Secondary School for her Advanced Certificate of education which she achieved in 2006.

In 2007, Aaliyah Nanfuka joined the Uganda College of Commerce and graduated with a Diploma in accounting and finance.

== Film career ==
While in college Nanfuka began her acting career in 2008 in a film titled Akasandali which was done by Nkoba Zambogo of Uganda College of Commerce in Tororo. She later joined Diamonds Ensemble which was owned by Kato Lubwama and popularly known for stage theatre drama.

In 2015, she started her own drama group called the Embassy of Dreams which she launched at Bat Valley Theatre in May of 2016. Aaliyah Nanfuka has released many films, skits and short drama videos which have featured on different television stations like See TV, Pearl Magic, and Sanyuka TV Uganda.

Aaliyah has featured in different popular films and skits like Mboozi Zamalwa where she acted as Kabejja, Prestige, a series film that showed at Pearl Magic television where she acted as Ssenga Zuura and Honorable a series movie that showed at Pearl Magic. She also featured films like Eggwengere that aired on Spark TV Uganda.

Aaliyah also featured in television dramas like Batabangufu which aired on Bukedde TV, a film by Kato Lubwama and Akandolindoli which also aired at Bukedde TV, a film by John Segawa. Aaliyah also featured in a series film called Nakayiza that only aired on her YouTube channel, a film that created more popularity of Nanfuka as an entertainer.

== Television career ==
In 2017, Aaliyah Nanfuka started working on Sanyuka TV Uganda as a presenter with a program called Kimmenya which aired every Sunday. She later joined See TV in 2021 with a program called Seetuation ku ground which was broadcast every Saturday hosted with a colleague Shamim Mayanja.

== Awards and nominations ==
In 2013, Aaliyah Nanfuka was nominated as the best actress in Uganda Film Festival Awards. Also in 2013 she received another nomination as the best actress in Piff Awards hosted in Kampala. In 2014 she won best supporting actress at the Piff Awards.

== Personal life ==
Aaliyah Nanfuka is married with two children. She has a private family life and she never features her family in the media.
