= Patrick Salvado Idringi =

Ugandan comedian and actor (born 1985)

- Born: Patrick Idringi Viera; 14 February 1985 (age 41); Kampala, Uganda
- Education: Makerere University (Muk)
- Spouse: Daphine Frankstock Idringi (m. 2020)
- Children: Abigail Idringi; Aayden Idringi; Alexander Idringi Dawa
- Parents: Lawrence Dawa (father); Joyce Dawa (mother)

Comedy career
- Years active: 2009–present
- Medium: Stand-up comedy, Television, Film, Radio
- Genres: Observational Comedy, Black Comedy, Dead Pan

Patrick Idringi (born 14 February 1985), known as Patrick Salvado, is a Ugandan comedian, actor, master of ceremonies, radio personality and engineer. He is also known as "The Arrogant Man". He was first runner up in the MultiChoice Africa organised comedy competition, Standup Uganda in 2009. He reached the semi-finals of the World's Funniest Person competition in 2016 and was nominated in 2017 and 2018 in the Savannah Comic Choice Awards as the Pan African Comic of the Year. He is also quite known for his sheer arrogance and hypocrisy

== Early life and education ==
=== 1985 - 2008 ===
Salvado was born on 14 February 1985 in Kampala. in a family of five boys and three girls. His father, Lawrence Dawa who comes from Koboko District operated a retail shop and his mother Joyce Dawa who originates from Democratic Republic of the Congo owned a stall in Bugolobi Market

Salvado began school in Our Lady of Africa Nursery and Primary School and later joined Kiswa Primary School where he sat for his Primary Leaving Examinations in 1997. He joined St. Charles Lwanga College, Koboko for his 'O'Level. In Secondary School, he used to make people laugh and because of this, he decided to join the school music, dance and drama club to practice comedy. After sitting for UCE in 2001 he was admitted to Bishop Cipriano Kihangire Senior Secondary where he sat Uganda Advanced Certificate of Education in 2003, He was then admitted to Makerere University Kampala. In 2008, he graduated with a Bachelor of Science in Telecommunications Engineering.

== Career ==
=== 2007 - 2010 ===
In 2007, in his third year in university, Salvado joined MTN Uganda working as a Tech Support.

In 2008, after completing his course in university, he was made permanent staff as a switch engineer at MTN Uganda. While still working for MTN Uganda, he approached Philip Luswata the managing director of Theatre Factory so he could join the comedy outfit in order to further his comedy career but was turned down. He acquired the Salvado name having cracked a joke on how a woman mistook him for Salvador, a character in a Telenovela called Second Chance

In 2009, Salvado participated in a comedy competition which was organised by Multichoice Africa, called Standup Uganda. He came second after Kenneth Pablo Kimuli. In the wake of this competition, he co-founded a comedy group called The Crackers together with Alex Muhangi, Daniel Omara, Kenneth Pablo Kimuli and Mendo. The Crackers staged their first show on 15 July 2009 at Effendy's Bar. When the crowds at Effendy's Bar became too many, The Crackers relocated to Theatre Labonita where they changed from holding weekly shows to two shows a month

In 2010, he was juggling between comedy and his daytime job at MTN Uganda

=== 2011 - 2020 ===
In September 2011, Salvado quit his job at MTN Uganda. In October 2011, he started work at 91.3 Capital Fm as a radio presenter in the Dream Breakfast Show and later on in the Overdrive Show. In September, he entertained at the Miss Uganda 2011 Beauty Pageant, This brought him into the limelight and opened doors for more gigs for him.

In 2012, internal division caused The Crackers to disband. In May, he performed in Night of 1000 Laughs in Nairobi. Salvado was featured in the May–June Italian Edition of Vogue Magazine. In June he performed in the Kampala edition of Night of 1000 Laughs. Also in June, he performed at the Miss Uganda Contest In September, Salvado curtain raised for the James Ingram show in Nairobi. and performed at the Uganda-UK convention. In October, he performed in the Lagos edition of Night of 1000 Laughs. In December, Salvado hosted the P-Square show in Kampala.

In March 2013, Salvado headlined at the Stand-Up Africa show in South Africa. In April, he performed at the Presidents of Laughrica together with Daliso Chaponda and Joshua Ncube in Malawi. In June, he performed at Kings of Comedy Kigali. In August, Salvado organised the First Africa Laughs comedy show in Kampala In November, he showcased in Night of a 1000 Laughs in Nairobi. In November, and December, he was part of the Glo Laffta Fest Comedy Tour, Nigeria. In December, he was a special guest comedian and co-mcee at Ugandan Diaspora Social Networking Gala. and he also performed in the Night of 1017 Laughs in Ghana.

In January 2014, Salvado performed at the 2013 Glo-CAF Awards in Abuja. He quit Capital FM Radio in March In May, he signed a deal to shoot an advert for DStv In June he performed both at Night of a 1000 Laughs in Kenya and Basketmouth Uncensored in Nigeria In July, he became the face of MTN's campaign Weekender Chacha Chat. Salvado organised and performed in the second edition of Africa Laughs in October which was hosted by Basketmouth, Acts that performed included Mc Kapale, Ronnie McVex, Alex Muhangi, Anne Kansiime, Eddie Kadi, Daliso Chaponda and Eric Omondi

In February 2015, Salvado was profiled on CNN In the same month, he performed at the Basketmouth Manchester Show in Manchester. In June, Salvado performed his first one-man show called Man from Ombokolo at Kampala Serena Hotel In September, he performed in the Night of Magic at the Outrigger Beach Resort, Mauritius and in November and December, Salvador was in South Africa for the Johannesburg international Comedy festival and the Comedy Central international Comedy festival respectfully.

In January 2016, Salvado extended his Man from Ombokolo show to Kigali, Rwanda at Hotel Portofino, as part of an East African Tour He was the closing act in Lord of the ribs at the Apollo Theatre, London. In early September, he was part of the 3rd Annual Gaborone International Music and Cultural Festival, Botswana. In late September, he organised Africa Laughs Season 3 whose line-up included both local (Anne Kansiime, Alex Muhangi, Madrat & Chico,Teacher Mpamire, Napoleone Emmah & Ronnie McVex) and international (Bovi, Eddie Kadi, Ndumiso Lindi, Carl Joshua Ncube, Eric Omondi and Arthur Nkusi) acts.

In February 2017, Salvado performed in the Lord of The Ribs at Wembley Arena, London. In March 2017 he formed an events company called Sheer Solutions Africa Ltd In October Salvado organised and performed his second one-man show, Man from Ombokolo 2

In January 2018, he hosted Lord of the Ribs show in London at the Wembley Arena. In April through his company, Sheer Solutions Salvado partnered with Next Media, to launch a competition for upcoming comedians called The Comic. In June, Salvado hosted the Tokosa Food Festival In mid-September, he was part of the Ug Pineapple Tour in Gulu before performing at Lord of the Ribs, Nigeria at the end of the month. In October, he organised the fourth Africa Laughs show. Local acts included Daniel Omara, Prince Emma, Ronnie McVex, Akite Agnes, and Omukebeete while the international acts had Prof Hamo, Kevin J, Basket mouth, Alfred Kainga, Eddie, Mc Jessy and Arthur Nkusi In November, he was part of the Global Comedy Fest, in Dubai.

In April 2019, Salvado performed at Sekafest in Kigali. In July he launched a weekly show called Just Comedy. The inaugural show was headlined by Eric Omondi In September, he hosted the 5th Edition of the Tokosa Food Festival.

In February 2020, Salvado organised the fifth Africa Laughs show. The local acts in this episode were Okello Okello, Napoleone Emmah, Uncle Mark, Daniel Omara and Ronnie McVex while the international acts included Eric Omondi, Eddie Kadi, Alfred Kainga, Kenny Blaq, Mpho Popps and musician Harmonize He was invited to perform at the African Comedy Festival in Qatar on 6 March 2020. In mid-March, Salvado was invited as the guest speaker for young entrepreneurs in the NSSF Career Expo 2020 In June he started work as a host in 88.2 Sanyu FM's Breakfast Show where he was working alongside Deedan and Yvonne from 6:00am to 10:00am.

=== 2021 - 2022 ===
In January 2021, Salvado performed at the Cheka Tu live festival in Dar es Salaam

In April 2022, Salvado started a new show called The Salvado Show which premiered on Pearl Magic Prime on DSTV. In the same month, he quit Sanyu Fm to concentrate on his comedy after the lock down was lifted in Uganda. In October 2022, he organised the 6th edition of Africa Laughs which included international and local acts like Celeste Ntuli, Eric Omondi, Golo, Q Dube, Akite Agnes, Okello Okello and Dr. Hilary

==== Genres ====
Observational Comedy, Black Comedy, Dead Pan

== Ambassadorship Roles ==
In January 2017, Salvado, together with Irene Ntale and Maurice Kirya were named ambassadors for WildAid, a non-profit organisation that seeks to end illegal wildlife trade

In July 2017, Salvador, together with Desire Luzinda was appointed as Jonny Walker whiskey ambassador.

== Philanthropy ==
In 2016, Salvado was the chief shoe shiner in a fund-raising drive that was meant to raise money for spinal surgery in India for a second-year university student, Raymond Bamwesigye who was attacked by unknown thugs.

In 2017, Salvado formed a charity called Dawa Foundation, after his father, which was aimed at helping unprivileged children

In 2018, he donated part of the proceeds of Man from Ombokolo 2 to Home of Hope, a home for disabled children.

== Personal life ==
Salvado is married to Daphnie Frankstork with three children. Abigail Idringi, Aayden Idringi and Alexander Idringi Dawa is the last born. In June 2019, Daphine Frankstock introduced Salvado to her parents in a ceremony in Kakiri. In December 2020 They got married at Mbuya Catholic Church. The couple met when he was working for MTN Uganda and had just ventured into comedy, while she was still in high school. He is a member of the Roman Catholic Church in Uganda.

== Controversies ==
Salvador and Alex Muhangi used to work together Diner's Club, Bukoto. They disagreed along the way and a feud ensued. Their differences seemed to have been put aside when Alex Muhangi attended Salvado's inaugural weekly comedy show, Just Comedy in 2019. However, their discord continued when they both organised shows that had international stars on the same day, 14 February 2020.

In January 2021after meeting the president Museveni at State Lodge, Nakasero, and openly showing support for him before the 2021 elections, Salvado came under heavy criticism, death threats and incitements were made to him and his family's life by people who did not support Yoweri Museveni

== Filmography ==
Year	Film/Television	Role	Notes
2019	Kyaddala	Wonny's father	TV series
2019	Bed of Thorns (film)	Waiswa	Film
2015	King of Darkness	Father Moses	Film
2014 - 2016	Beneath The Lies - The Series	Kizito Semwanga	TV series
2023	Kizazi Moto: Generation Fire	Dushiime (voice)	TV series

== Nominations and awards ==
Year	Award	Category	Nominee(s)	Result	Ref
2010	Young Achievers Award	Entertainment Category	Salvado	Nominated	
2015	Uganda Entertainment Awards	Best Male Comedian	Salvado	Won	
2016	Laugh Factory	World's Funniest Person	Salvado	Nominated	
2017	Savannah Comic Choice Awards	Pan African Comic of the Year	Patrick Idringi (Salvado), Bright Okpocha (Basketmouth), Carl Joshua Ncube, Tshepo "Masapo" Mpiti, Fernando Filipe	Nominated	
2018	Savannah Comic Choice Awards	Pan African Comic of the Year	Patrick Idringi (Salvado), Bright Okpocha (Basketmouth), Carl Joshua Ncube, Kansiime Anne Entertainer, Charles Manase	Nominated	
