= Manuela P. Mulondo =

Ugandan educator and businesswoman

- Born: Manuela Pacutho Mulondo; 1985 December 18
- Citizenship: Uganda
- Education: Bachelor of Science in Statistics and Psychology, Certificate in Marketing
- Alma mater: Our Lady of Good Counsel Gayaza Senior Secondary School,King's College Budo, Makerere University, Chartered Institute of Marketing
- Occupations: Businesswoman, entrepreneur, educator, author, television presenter, gender equality advocate
- Title: Founder and CEO of The Cradle
- Spouse: Brian Mulondo
- Parents: Joe Pacutho (father); Agnes Ruteitsire (mother)
- Awards: First runner-up of Season 1 of Rising Woman

Manuela Pacutho Mulondo (born 18 December 1985) is a Ugandan businesswoman, entrepreneur, educator, author, marketing consultant, TV Presenter, and gender equality advocate.

She is the founder and CEO of The cradle, a child care, lactation and education center and President Early Childhood Development Association. She co-founded "Bump Love," a television and web series about motherhood, and is also the author of "STOP Listen to Your Child Think". She was selected for the 2017 Mandela Washington Fellowship and the 2021 Obama Foundation Leaders Africa Summit.

== Background and education ==
Pacutho was born to Agnes Ruteitsire a Munyankore and Joe Pacutho an Alur from West Nile and raised in Kampala, Uganda. She is the eldest of her mother's three children, but the seventh of her father's ten. In 1997 her mother got involved in an accident and lost her job, while her father, who had been a warden at Makerere University's Nsibirwa Hall, also retired.

At 16 years old, she started hawking juice on Kampala Road to help her mother feed her and her brothers till to get an income, they started selling off their own clothes.

She went to Kitante Primary School. She received a scholarship from Forum for African Women Educationalists (FAWE) for her secondary school education, joined Our Lady of Good Counsel Gayaza Senior Secondary School for O level and King's College Budo for her Uganda Advanced Certificate of Education. She attained a government scholarship in 2005 for her Bachelor of Science in Statistics and Psychology Makerere University where she graduated in 2008. She joined the Chartered Institute of Marketing in 2012 and graduated with a Professional Certificate in Marketing in 2017.

== Career ==
From January 2008 to January 2009, Pacutho was a Marketing Assistant for People Performance Group, a human resource consulting firm in Kampala, Uganda and in January 2008 to April 2012, she worked as the Creative director in the Children's Ministry at Watoto Church.

She joined Bank of Africa Uganda as a brand manager in April 2012 till April 2014, when she was then elevated to Assistant Manager Marketing and Communications a position she held from to January 2016, before being promoted to Manager Marketing and Communications. She served as Manager from to June 2016, after which she resigned to focus on her private business.

She is the founder and CEO of The cradle child care which started in 2014. Four years later scaled its business to the Cradle Care Mobile App. As of 2021, she had up to 100 clients. In February 2021, as a safety precaution against COVID-19, it shutdown and reopened in January 2022, and 5 months later, grew to two branches.

In 2019 she co-founded "Bump Love," a television and web series about motherhood, which airs on NTV Uganda and also is a presenter on the show. She is a RUBiS UltraTec fuel brand ambassador since 2021, I&M Bank Uganda, Bank Brand Manager and President Early childhood development Association.

== Awards and accomplishments ==
- Second runner-up Business Apprenticeship Entrepreneurship Competition Africa conducted by Inspire Africa in 2012.
- 2017 for the Mandela Washington Fellowship.
- She emerged first runner-up of Season 1 of ‘Rising Woman’ in 2018 initiative
- Launched the book Stop, Listen to your child think in 2019.
- She came up with a course "Childcare Business Course" to stimulate infants minds and teach them character for kids 0 to 4 years old.
- 2021 Obama Foundation Leaders Africa Summit.

== Personal life ==
She is married to Brian Mulondo who she met on a trip to Kenya while at university and they have two children .

== See also ==
- Shakila Rahim Lamar
- Zari Hassan
- Leona Buhenzire
