= Fun Factory Uganda =

Ugandan entertainment company

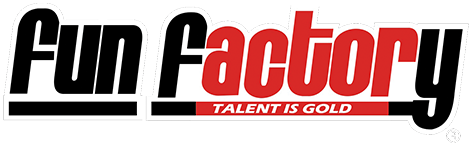
- Industry: Entertainment
- Founded: 5 January 2010; 16 years ago
- Founders: Hannington Bugingo; Richard Tuwangye; Veronica Namanda Kiwanuka; Dickson Zzizinga; Gerald Rutaro Mbabazi; Kwezi Kaganda; Kuddzu Isaac; Frobisher Lwanga; Veronica Tindichebwa; Evelyn Kemizinga; Ninah Katamba; Anne Kansiime; Emma Kakai; Destiny Mutaasa; Catherine Bagaya
- Headquarters: First Floor, F03, National Theatre, Kampala, Uganda
- Key people: Hannington Bugingo (Managing Director); Richard Tuwangye (Communications Director); Dickson Zzizinga (Creative Director); Veronica Namanda Kiwanuka (Assistant Creative Director); Gerald Rutaro (Finance and Administration)
- Products: Sketch Comedy; Television; Event Management

Fun Factory Uganda is a Ugandan entertainment company based in Kampala. It was founded in 2010, with its flagship product being sketch comedy. It also has branched into television shows and event management. FFU's cast are trained at Makerere University School of Liberal and Performing Arts. Their products include Comedicine, U-Turn, and Mizigo Express.

== History ==
=== Founding ===
Fun Factory Uganda got its start when fourteen members of Theatre Factory had a misunderstanding with the group's administration and broke away to form their own troupe on 5 January 2010, leaving only two members in the original Theatre Factory group.

=== 2010–2019: The hustle begins ===
FFU's inaugural show was on 14 January 2010, performing at Pan World parking lot. They then proceeded to perform weekly on the same days and times that they used to at the National Theatre, where they attracted many youth and other fans. With an ever-growing audience, the management of the parking lot increased the group's rent, causing them to shift to the Hotel Africana poolside. After a few months, they had a disagreement with the hotel management, and had to relocate again, this time to Cinema Plaza. However, things were more challenging there, so they decided to search for a new location. They finally came to a mutual understanding with the National Theatre.

=== Comedicine ===
Comedicine is a sketch comedy created by FFU that has aired on a weekly basis. since inception of the group, except the first weeks of 2018. The show's success attracted soft drink brand Mirinda to partner with Fun Factory in the regional Mirinda Comedy tour in 2014.

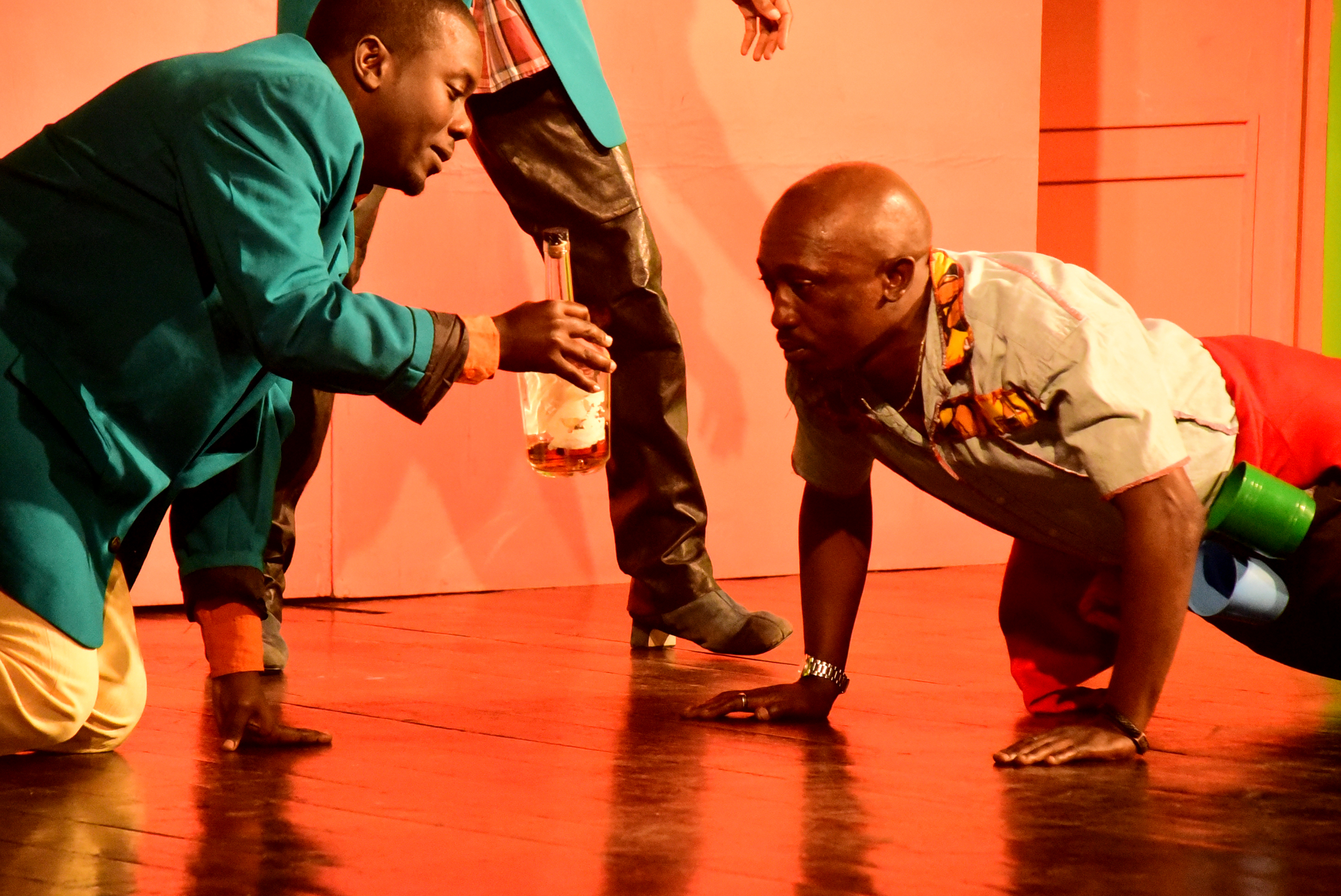
Onstage during Comedicine

Present cast
	Series	Recurring Characters	Notes
Hannington Bugingo	The Musoga Series	Lukakamwa	
	Lying Series	Kikonyogo	Also known as Chicco
		As Andrew Mwenda	The journalist
		Radio host	
Richard Tuwangye		The arrogant Munyankole	Always talking to an "Amos" on the phone
		Junior	Kisitu's nephew, who has a cat-and-dog relationship with his uncle
	UTI (Under the Influence)	Phobia	The drunkard
Dickson ZZizinga		Kisitu	A man who depends on his sister and comes to her in case of emergencies
	Hajji Series	Hajji	A conservative Muslim man with an elastic number of wives
		Sheikh Zzizu	A Muslim cleric who has a wealth of knowledge above everyone else and is always predicting the future
Kuddzu Isaac	The Musoga Series	Lyagobba	
		Kasumali	A chaotic and unpredictable character
Anne Kansiime			
Herbert Ssegujja		Teacher Mpamire	
		As Drake Ssekeba	The journalist
Frobisher Lwanga	UTI (Under the Influence)	Amnesia	
Nina Katamba	Hajji Series	One of Hajji's wives	
Cathy Bagaya			
Tindi Mustapha	Hajji Series	One of Hajji's wives	
Gloria Kebirungi			
Simon Kalema	UTI (Under the Influence)	Tilapia	
		English teacher	English school teacher with a unique English that he himself calls 'Engrish'
Raymond Rushabiro	UTI (Under the Influence)	Insomnia	
		As Kasirye Ggwanga	
Gerald Rutaro			
Evelyn Kemizinga		Junior's mother	
	Hajji Series	One of Hajji's wives	
Veronica Namanda	Hajji Series	One of Hajji's wives	

==== Guest appearances ====
- Daniel Omara
- Akite Agnes
- Okello Okello
- Patrick Salvador Idringi
- Don Andre

=== End-of-year shows ===
Fun Factory Uganda has been hosting an end-of-year show called Five Star Madness since 2014.

2014 - Five Star Madness

2015 - Five Star Madness

2016 - Five Star Madness

2019 - Five Star Madness

=== U-Turn ===
U-Turn is a television show filmed and produced from live shows that take place every Thursday. Originally, it was called Barbed Wire, under Theatre Factory, but when the members formed Fun Factory, they recreated the show and renamed it. In 2012, U-Turn was voted as the second best locally produced show on TV. Following an annual survey by Synovate, U-Turn was the most watched entertainment TV show in Uganda. This prompted Mirinda, the show's sponsor, to come to an agreement and air U-Turn on NBS So, in 2015, U-Turn started airing on NBS TV.

=== Mizigo Express ===
Mizigo Express is a sitcom produced by Fun Factory. It premiered on 3 October 2018.

== Discography ==
- Yambala Mask
- Weekume Weka

== Filmography ==
Works
Show	Year	TV	Recognition
U-Turn	2010–2015	NTV	Voted second best locally produced TV programme after NTV's Akawungeezi; Most watched TV programme (Synovate Survey)
	2015–2017	NBS	
Mizigo Express	2018–present	Pearl Magic (DStv)	

== Awareness campaigns ==
- April 2015 – Comedicine was used in an awareness campaign when FFU partnered with the Citizens' Coalition for Electoral Democracy in Uganda (CCEDU), in order to encourage people to register to vote.
- April 2015 – Raised 2 million shillings from the show Organised Chaos to help with treatment of Rosemary Nankabirwa, a former news anchor with NTV Uganda.

== See also ==
- Anne Kansiime
- Akite Agnes
- Herbert Ssegujja
