= Akite Agnes =

Ugandan comedian, actress, and philanthropist (born 1983)

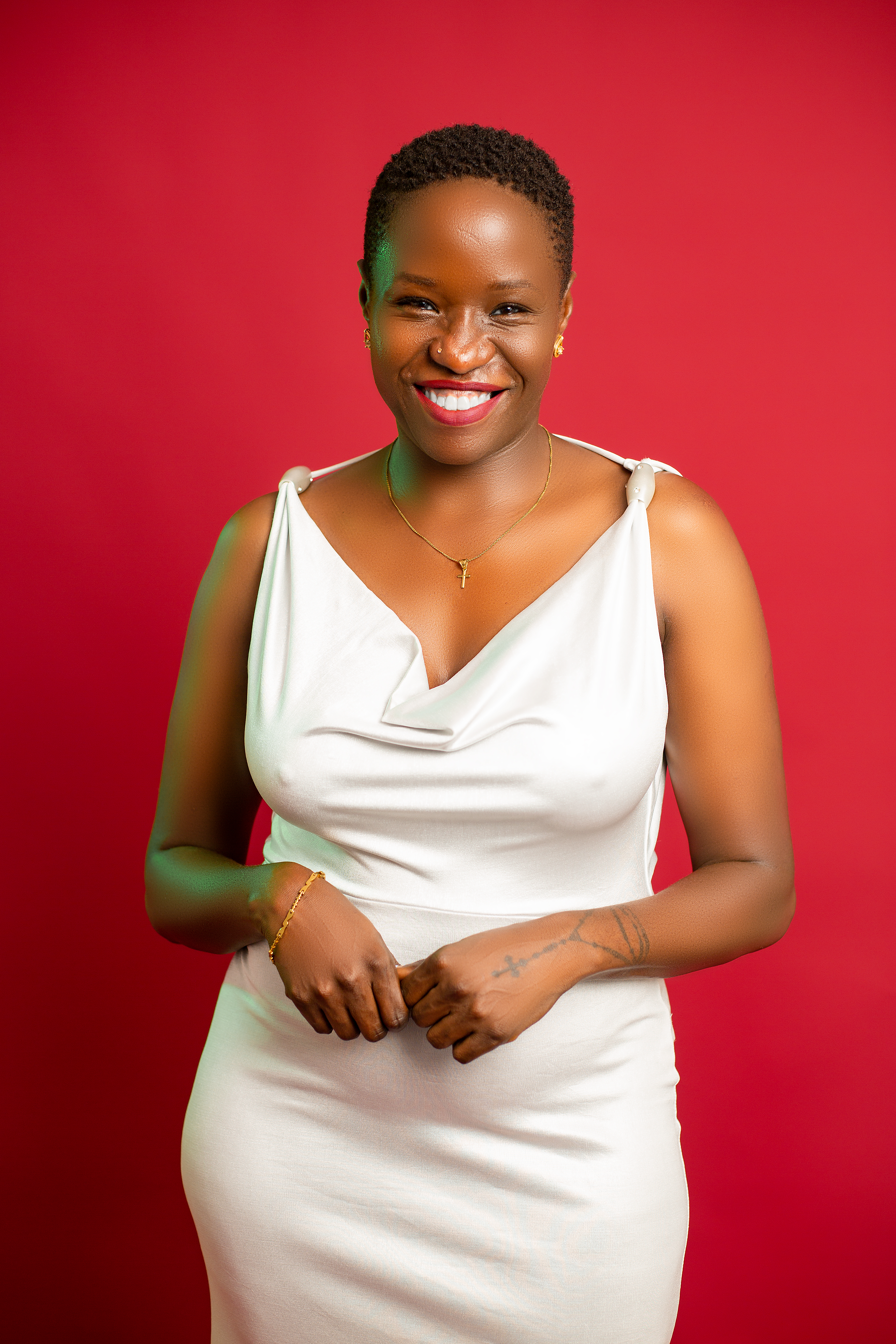
- Agnes in 2025
- Born: Akite Agnes Opio; 19 March 1983; Kampala, Uganda
- Education: Makerere University (Bachelor of Tourism)
- Children: 2

Comedy career
- Years active: 2009–present
- Medium: Stand-up; television
- Genres: Observational comedy; self-deprecation
- Subjects: Everyday life; relationships
- Website: akiteagnes.com

Akite Agnes (born 19 March 1983) is a Ugandan stand-up comedian, actress, MC, and philanthropist. She is popularly known for her role as Arach in the series The Hostel. She has also acted in Pearl Magic's Girl from Mparo as Mama Brian, the nosy neighbour. Her style of comedy reflects on the daily issues that people face as they go about their lives.

== Early life and education ==
Agnes was born on 19 March 1983, in Kampala, Uganda, the fifth of nine children. Raised in the Catholic faith, Agnes attended St. Kizito Primary School in Bugolobi. She continued her education at Our Lady of Good Counsel in Gayaza, for her secondary studies. Agnes completed her Uganda Certificate of Education at Naalya Secondary School in Namugongo and went on to pursue her A-levels at St. Lawrence Creamland Campus, achieving her Uganda Advanced Certificate of Education. In 2003, she enrolled at Makerere University, where she earned a bachelor of arts degree in tourism.

== Career ==
In 2009, Agnes was approached by Anne Kansiime to act in a new TV comedy series called The Hostel after her friend had turned it down. She was given the part of Arach without auditioning.

In 2014, she began her comedy act with a group called the Punchliners, after being persuaded by Anne Kansiime and Daniel Omara to try stand-up comedy. In 2016, she appeared in Girl from Mparo a series that aired on UBC.

In 2018, Agnes began performing solo on different comedy platforms, including Rock Comedy and Comedy Store Ug, hosted by Alex Muhangi. In June, she appeared in the Kampala Comedy Festival, hosted by the comedian Okello Okello. On her return to Comedy Stores Ug in August, she impressed the crowd, with the clip going viral on WhatsApp, where she was heaped with praise. Between August and November, Agnes was a permanent member of the UG Pineapple Comedy Tour, which took her to different parts of the country, including Mbale, Gulu, Fort Portal, Jinja, and Mbarara. She was part of the group from Comedy Store Ug that went to Mbarara for its maiden show outside Kampala. Agnes was featured on Africa Laughs in October, at Kampala Serena Hotel, hosted by Patrick Salvador Idringi.

In March 2019, Agnes created and hosted the Arise Woman! Comedy Jam on International Women's Day. In celebration of the holiday, the show comprised an all-female cast, which included Nancy Kobusheshe, Maggie the Bwaiserian, Rich Mouth, Dora Nakagga, Leila Kachapizo, and the Fun Factory ladies. Part of the proceeds of the show was given to charity. Later that month, Agnes returned to Kigali as part of the Seka Fest, with comedians from Uganda, Kenya, and Nigeria. In April, she appeared on The Comedian's OutLuke Podcast, presented by the comedian Luke Anthony. In July, she was one of the Ugandan comedians who performed in the Laugh Festival in Nairobi, Kenya, and in September, she performed at the Uganda North America Association Convention in Chicago. In December, she headlined the One Africa Festival, in a bid to fight xenophobia in Port Elizabeth, South Africa.

Agnes went on to host the second season of Arise Woman Comedy Jam in March 2020, which featured female comedians from Fun Factory Uganda as well as Anne Kansiime, among others. In October 2022, she was the opening act in Patrick Salvado Idringi's Africa Laughs sixth edition.

In October 2024, she hosted her first solo show, at the Uganda National Cultural Centre, titled Son of Opio.

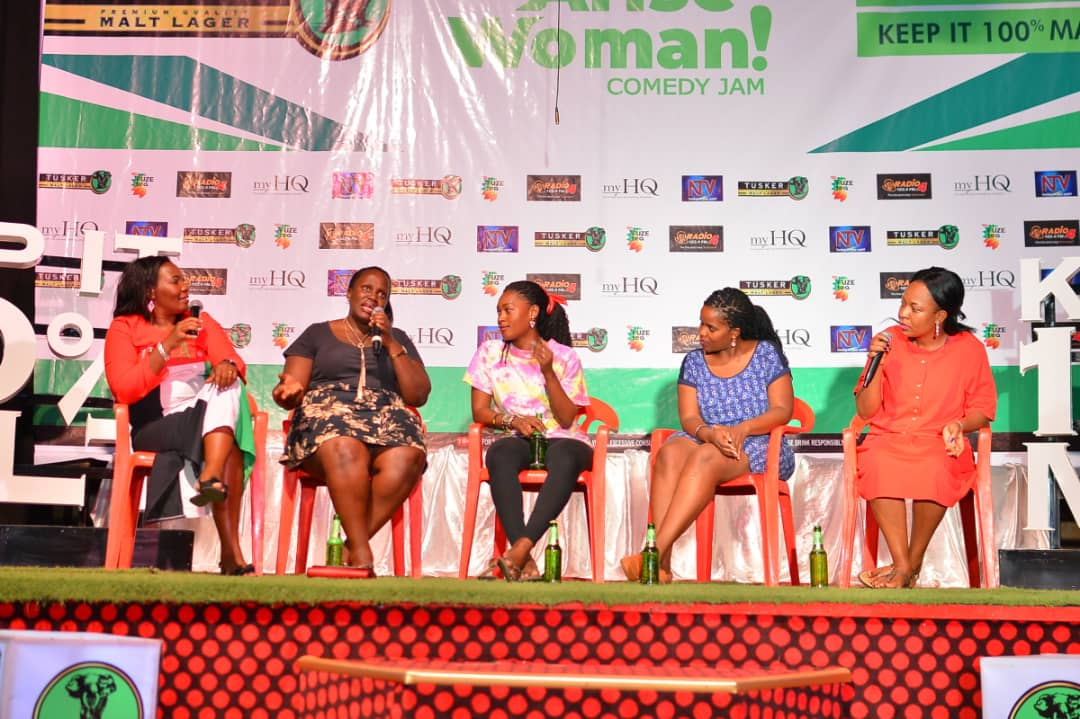
Ladies of the Fun Factory doing a skit during the Arise Woman! Comedy Show

== Style of comedy ==
Agnes's style of stand-up is observational comedy, where she points out the funny side of daily life. She also sometimes uses self-deprecation in her humour. She avoids political humour.

== Personal life ==
Agnes is the fifth-born in a family of two brothers and six sisters. She is the mother of two children. She is Catholic and attends Our Lady of Africa Church. On 9 November 2023, she was attacked and beaten up by thugs as she made her way back home from a quiz night in Najjera, sustaining a head wound and a bruised eye.

== Philanthropy ==
Agnes is the co-founder and CEO of Arise Woman Foundation, which advocates for and empowers women and youth.

== Filmography ==
Acting appearances in film and television
Year	Title	Role	Network	Notes
2009–2012	The Hostel	Arach	NTV Uganda, DStv – Africa Magic Entertainment, ZUKU TV, and NTV KENYA	
2016	Girl from Mparo	Mama Brian	UBC, DStv – Pearl Magic	
2018–present	Mizigo Express	Sam's girlfriend	DStv – Pearl Magic	
