= Watoto Child Care Ministries =

Started in 1994, Watoto Child Care Ministries is a branch of the Watoto Church in Uganda that builds villages with schools, churches, medical centers, and homes and populates them with new families built from orphans and widows. Currently there are three villages: Bbira and Suubi near Kampala and Laminadera outside Gulu. Other projects being undertaken by Watoto Child Care Ministries include baby homes, vocational training, and farms to support the villages. Watoto Child Care Ministries is also the organization that runs the Watoto Children's Choir which tours internationally every year. Watoto aims to "raise the next generation of African leaders".

== Watoto Model ==
The Watoto Model is one that Watoto seeks to replicate all over Africa and has been successfully executed in Gulu, Uganda and twice near Kampala, Uganda. Watoto villages build homes for eight orphans and one widow mother and build a family to live together in it. The Watoto Church also runs a program called Father's Heart which enlists male role models to work and play with the children. Along with homes, these villages include schools, clinics, community centers, and churches. In this way, the children who live in the village are cared for physically, emotionally, and spiritually until they are adults. Along with these programs, Watoto is stretching out into farming and technical education as a means of sustainability and as another layer to strengthen the students and the community.

== See also ==
- Watoto Church
- Watoto Children's Choir
