= SEE TV =

Ugandan TV network

- Country: Uganda
- Affiliates: Prime Media Network
- Headquarters: Naguru, Kampala

Programming
- Languages: English, Luganda
- Picture format: 1080i HDTV (downscaled to 16:9 576i for the SDTV feed)

Ownership
- Owner: Brutus Kagingo
- Parent: Prime Media

History
- Launched: 1 August 2021

Links
- Website: https://seetv.co.ug/

Availability

Terrestrial
- FTA: 36
- GOTV: 833
- Startimes: 248

SEE TV is a Ugandan television network based in the Naguru neighborhood of Kampala.

== Overview ==
The channel was launched in July 2021. It started broadcasting on 1 August 2021 The station is known for its focus on News, politics, also has a series of business, edu-entertainment, Lifestyle, sports, and entertainment shows.

== Notable programs ==
- Pm Edition
- Enjuba Egoloobye
- Brunch Request Live
- 411 Paparazzi
- Sunrise at SEE
- The Big Debate
- The Grill
- Impact Show
- Seetuation Ku Ground
- The Booth

== Presenters ==
- Adams Mayambala
- Melissa Mboha
- Bux Munira
- Ramlah Katumba
- Kalaki Brian
- Simon Chris Makanga
- Amelia Martha Nakitimbo
- Gabriel Iguma
- Auma Shivan Shiela
- Apollo Sarah
- Aggie Uwase
- Starborn Timkash
- Shamim Mayanja
- Aaliyah Nanfuka
- Privah Eliberz
