= Penny Tinditina =

Ugandan news anchor and journalist

- Born: Penny
- Died: 2017; Seattle, United States
- Citizenship: Uganda
- Occupations: news anchor; Radio presenter; Journalist
- Employers: BBC; Bill and Melinda Gates Foundation; Uganda Television (UBC)
- Spouse: Alex Jakana
- Children: Three children; *Darren: Dione; Divine

Penny Tinditina, also known as Penny Jakana (died on April 19, 2017), was a former Uganda Television news anchor, Radio 1 news anchor and presenter and BBC journalist in the early 2000s. She died at the age of 39.

== Background ==
In 2016, Penny was diagnosed with lung cancer and died in 2017 in Seattle, United States, where she had battled for her life for more than a year. Her funeral service was held at Watoto Church in Kampala. She was remembered for being kind, polite, and focused. When she died, a memorial fund was created by friends on GoFundMe to support her funeral financially in Uganda. She was buried at her ancestral home in Nyakiganda village in Nyabuhikye, Ibanda District. Her vigil took place at her parents' home in Buwaate-Najeela. Her husband described her as a "loving and courageous woman who not only had time for the family but also transformed him".

== Career ==
She worked at the Bill and Melinda Gates Foundation in Washington State, US at the time of her death and was a former journalist with the BBC. She also worked at Uganda Television, now known as UBC.

== Personal life ==
Penny had three children: Darren, Dione, and Divine, with her husband Alex Jakana.

== See also ==
- Brenda Zobbo
- Alex Jakana
- Alan Kasujja
- Bill and Melinda Gates Foundation
- Elvis Kalema
- Edris Kiggundu
