= Kiwani: The Movie =

2008 Ugandan drama film

- Directed by: Henry H. Ssali
- Produced by: Henry H. Ssali
- Starring: Hanington Bugingo; Juliana Kanyomozi; Allan Tumusiime; Flavia Tumusiime
- Production company: Ssali Productions
- Distributed by: Ssali Publications
- Release date: 12 April 2008 (Uganda)
- Country: Uganda
- Languages: English; Luganda; Swahili
- Budget: 16 million Uganda shillings

Kiwani: The Movie is a 2008 Ugandan drama film starring Juliana Kanyomozi, Hannington Bugingo, Allan Tumusiime and Flavia Tumusiime, and directed and produced by Henry H. Ssali, a Ugandan journalist. The movie tells a tale of cheap tricks used by thieves and pickpockets on the streets of Uganda's capital city, Kampala, the lives of university students and corporate personalities entangled.

== Cast ==
Source: * Hannington Bugingo as Kaggwa, a pickpocket and conman

- Allan Tumusiime as Mwesigye, Kaggwa's junior apprentice at pick-pocketing
- Juliana Kanyomozi as Judith, a desperate lonely corporate woman seeking love online
- Flavia Tumusiime as Pam, a university student and niece to Juliana
