= Salvado =

Salvado is a surname. Notable people with the surname include:

- Albert Salvadó (1951–2020), Andorran writer and industrial engineer
- Alex Salvado (1890–1954), Australian rules footballer
- Davide Salvado (born 1981), Galician musician
- John Salvado (born 1939), Australian cricketer
- Luciana Salvadó (born 1990), Argentinian handballer
- Rosendo Salvado (1814–1900), Benedictine monk

== See also ==
- Patrick Salvador Idringi (born 1985), comedian
