= Cotilda Inapo =

Ugandan comedian, MC, actress, and all round creative

- Born: Cotilda Inapo Obonyo; Kampala, Uganda
- Education: Makerere University (Bachelor of computer science )
- Children: 1

Comedy career
- Years active: 2009–present
- Medium: Stand-up; television
- Genres: story telling; observational comedy
- Subjects: Everyday life; relationships

Cotilda Inapo is a Ugandan female stand-up comedian, with a career spanning over a decade in comedy and entertainment. She joined professional comedy in 2009 as the first officially recognized female standup Comedienne in Uganda quickly becoming a regular with The Crackers—whose performances aired as the “Mic Check” comedy show on NTV and NBS from 2010 to 2013. and NBS from 2010 to 2013

== Education ==
Cotilda completed her Primary education at Hormisdallen primary school in Kamwokya. She continued her education at Gayaza High school where she completed her Uganda Certificate of Education. She went on to pursue her A-levels at Uganda Martyrs Senior Secondary School Namugongo, achieving her Uganda Advanced Certificate of Education. She then enrolled at Makerere University, where she earned a bachelor of sciences degree in Computer Science. In 2022 she attained certification in Digital Film Making skills at NetStudios Africa in partnership with Mastercard Foundation.

== Career ==
In 2013, Cotilda founded Queens of Comedy Uganda, a pioneering platform that mentors female comedians, empowering them to find their comedic voice and thrive in the male-dominated industry.

That same year(2013), she also became a breakfast radio show host for Galaxy FM 100.2, a leading urban youth station in Kampala, a position she held until 2015. She was nominated for Best Female Comedian at the Zzina Awards during this period.

Concurrently 2013 was the year she became the creative director and lead writer for Anne Kansiime, a leading African female Comedienne a role she held until 2018. Anne Kansiime

2014 to 2017 she was a regular performer and one of the directors at Comedy Files a comedy unit that performed weekly at Theatre La Bonita in Kampala, Uganda.

In 2015 she was the host for "Anne Kansiime and Teacher Mpamire live in Malawi" and also the host for "Extreme Comedy" in Kenya.

In 2015 under her Queens of Comedy platform she took the ladies for the Queens of Comedy Vs Kings of Comedy show that took place in Kigali.

In 2016, she co founded creative stamp an advertising and talent agency.

In 2016 to 2017 she was the copywriter, script editor and supervisor for the DSTV campaign that featured Anne Kansiime for a year as their brand ambassador.

In 2018 she was the co-creator and assistant director for Girl from Mparo - a sitcom by Anne Kansiime.

Since 2018, she has expanded her work in the arts by making movies, hosting events, and going on comedy tours around the world. This person has played the role of "Sarah" in the movie "Leila" as well as "Ann" in the current Pearl Magic series "Damalie."

She has performed at comedy shows in Zambia, Kenya (Churchill Show), Nigeria (Night Of A Thousand Laughs alongside comedians like Basketmouth in 2012) and Malawi (hosted with Teacher Mpamiire and Anne Kansiime), UK, Botswana, Namibia, South Africa, Rwanda, Tanzania and Zimbabwe.

In 2024, Cotilda launched My Favourite Stories Podcast, where she sits down with top personalities to share their most memorable stories. Her first two episodes featured comedians Daniel Omara and Don Andre.

In March 2025 the first comedy club in Uganda in which Cotilda serves as one of the directors; Laughing Maraboustork comedy club was launched.

She was also nominated for the Female Standup Comedian of the year in the 2025 Africa Golden Awards.

Her social media handle is "CotildaTheComedian" on Instagram, Facebook, TikTok, X and "Cotilda Comedy Africa" on YouTube.

== Personal life ==
Cotilda has a son.

== Filmography ==
Acting appearances in film and television
Year	Title	Role	Platform	Notes
2010	Christmas in Kampala	Herself	NTV Uganda	Feature Film for TV
2016	Girl from Mparo	Co-creator and assistant director	UBC, DStv – Pearl Magic	Sitcom
2017	It’s Business Unusual	Script Writer and supervisor	DStv – Pearl Magic	DSTV Anne Kansiime Brand Ambassador campaign
2023	Leila	Sarah-Supporting Actress	NetStudios Africa	Feature Film
2023–Present	Damalie	Ann - Supporting Actress	DStv – Pearl Magic	Drama TV Series
