= Watoto Church =

- Watoto Ministries
- Watoto
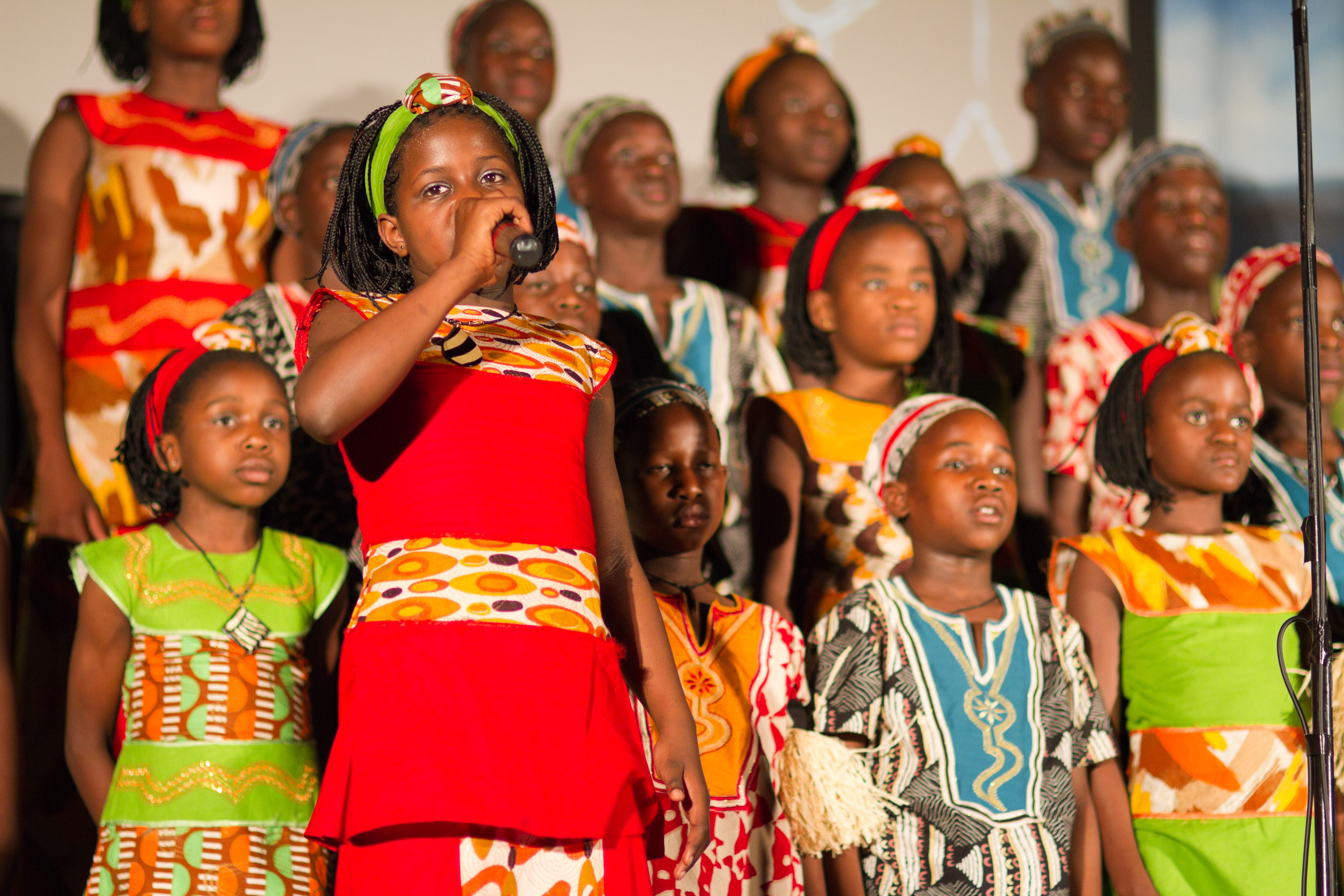
- Watoto Children's Choir

- Location within Uganda
- 0.3189855°N 32.5749527°E
- Location: Kampala
- Country: Uganda
- Denomination: Pentecostal
- Website: http://www.watotochurch.com/

History
- Former name: Kampala Pentecostal Church
- Founded: April 22, 1984; 42 years ago
- Founder(s): Gary Skinner, Marilyn Skinner
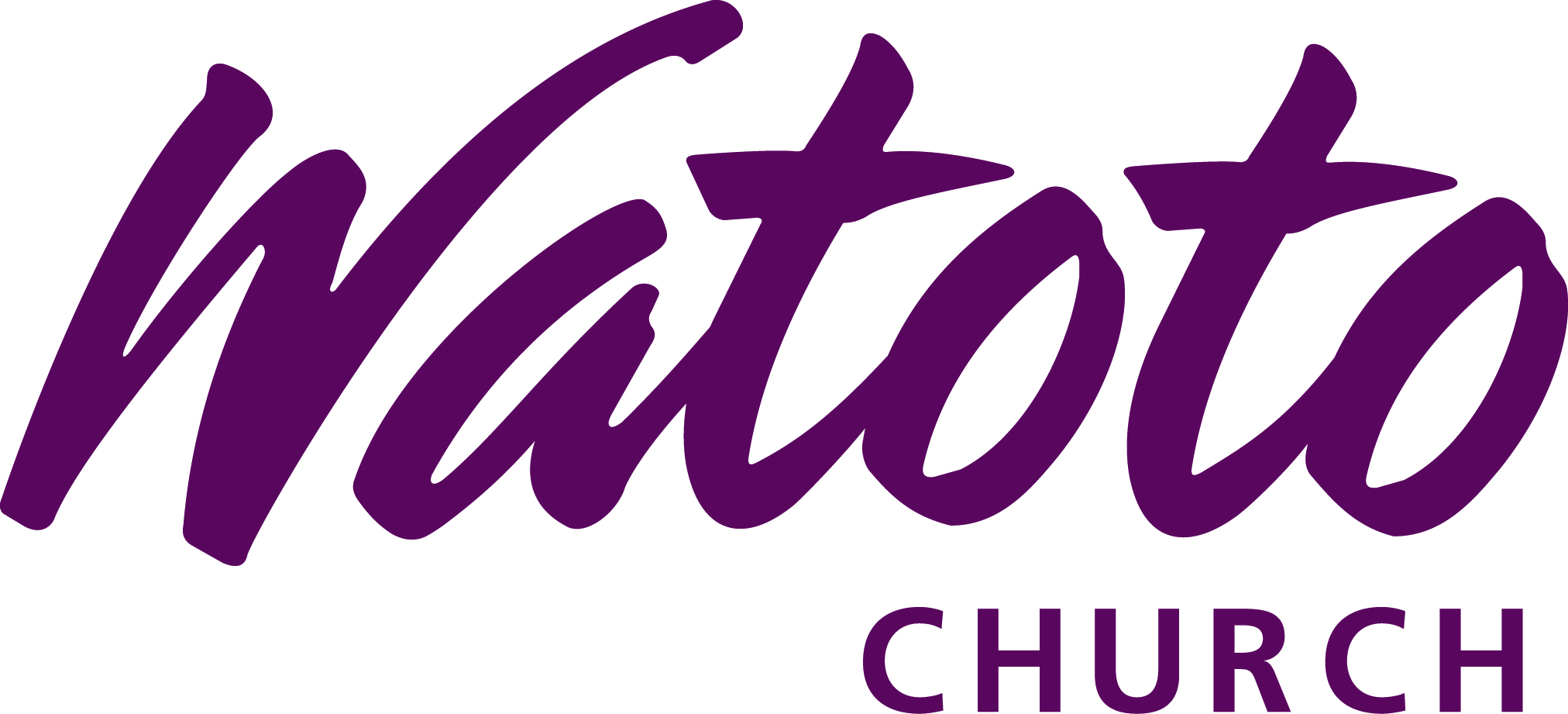

Watoto Church, formerly Kampala Pentecostal Church (KPC) is a Pentecostal church headquartered in Kampala, Uganda. Watoto means 'the children' in Swahili. The church operates Watoto Child Care Ministries and Watoto Children's Choir.

== Background ==
The church was founded in 1984 in Kampala by Canadian missionaries Pastor Gary Skinner and his wife, Marylin. Initially, it operated out of Kampala's Imperial Hotel before the leadership took over a disused cinema which was renamed The Centre.

In February 2023, the Skinners formally stepped down from their 40-year role as team leaders of Watoto Ministries. They were succeeded by the current leaders, Julius Rwotlonyo and Vernita Rwotlonyo.

== Church locations and congregation ==
The church has an average congregation of 37,000 people who also meet in smaller cell groups. Each cell comprises about seven to ten members who meet at least once a week in members' homes.

Watoto's main church is dubbed Watoto Church Downtown and has expanded over the years across the city with Watoto Church Ntinda, Bweyogerere, Lubowa, Kyengera, Kansanga, Bugolobi and Entebbe. The church has also expanded across Uganda with Watoto Church Bbira in Wakiso District, Watoto Church Suubi in Mpigi District, Watoto Church Gulu, Watoto Church Laminadera in Omoro District, Watoto Church Mbarara in Mbarara City, Jinja, Juba in South Sudan, Watoto Church Nansana and more recently Watoto Church Mukono.

== Notable members and supporters ==
From January 2008 to April 2012, Manuela P. Mulondo worked as the creative director in the children's ministry at Watoto Church.

Stuart Robert, a former Australian Liberal MP, has had deep ties to the church. He credited its founder, Gary Skinner, as a major influence, served as a founding director of Watoto Australia, and volunteered extensively in Uganda.

In 2017, Penny Tinditina's funeral was held at the church. She worked for the Gates Foundation at the time of her death from lung cancer.

Julia Sebutinde is a member of the church. In August 2025, according to an article in the Daily Monitor she declared at the church that "the Lord is counting on me to stand on the side of Israel", shared her "strong conviction that we are in the End Times" prophesied in the Bible, and stated her will "to be on the right side of History". Kenneth Pablo Kimuli, a comedian and journalist, is a member of the church.

In 2025, Skinner delivered the keynote address at the 37th annual Ugandan North American Association (UNAA) convention in New Orleans, Louisiana.

== Children's ministry and performances ==
Watoto Church is home to Watoto Child Care Ministries, a ministry that assists vulnerable children and women in Uganda and which is best known for its Watoto Children's Choirs that tour internationally, proselytizing, and raising money for the organisation. Lydia Jazmine was a part of the choir.

Watoto currently operates three villages for orphaned children. These are home to more than 3000 children.

During the COVID-19 pandemic, the church was criticised for refusing to postpone or cancel a scheduled tour of its children's choir. According to Uganda's child affairs minister, the Internal Security Organisation needed to investigate Watoto church for alleged breaches of child labour laws.

Watoto Church produces an annual Christmas cantata, as well as a gospel drama play every four years known as Heaven's Gates and Hell's Flames. The shows are a mixture of live performance music, dance, scripted drama, sounds and lighting effects. Historically, the cantata has run through the week before Christmas.

== Leadership ==
Watoto Church has a leadership structure, with the Church Council at its apex. It is the overall policy organ of Watoto Church and all its ministries. The council is responsible for strategic policy decisions as well as the management and smooth running of the church. It is made up of the Pastoral Team, the Elders' Team and the Deacons' Team.

The deacons' team at Watoto Church oversees the physical needs of the church, including drafting policies for daily operations, managing finances, maintaining church property, and ensuring adequate remuneration for pastors and staff. They also assist in administering ordinances, hiring and disciplining employees, and appointing department team leaders on behalf of the Church Council. The elders' team is responsible for governing the direction of the church, guarding its doctrines, and together with the pastoral team, providing direction and authority within the church.

Pastor Julius Rwotlonyo is the current team leader of Watoto ministries, assisted by various campus pastors and other ministry leaders. The pastoral team, led by Pastor Edward Mwesigye, is responsible for the spiritual oversight of the church and its membership.

== Views on sexuality ==
Watoto Church believes that sex may take place only within the confines of a monogamous, heterosexual marriage relationship. For this reason, Watoto Church has received criticism for its stance on homosexuality. Scott Lively's visit and the 2014 Uganda Anti-Homosexuality Act allegedly arose as a result of the conference.
