= Juliana Kanyomozi =

Ugandan musician, actress (born 1980)

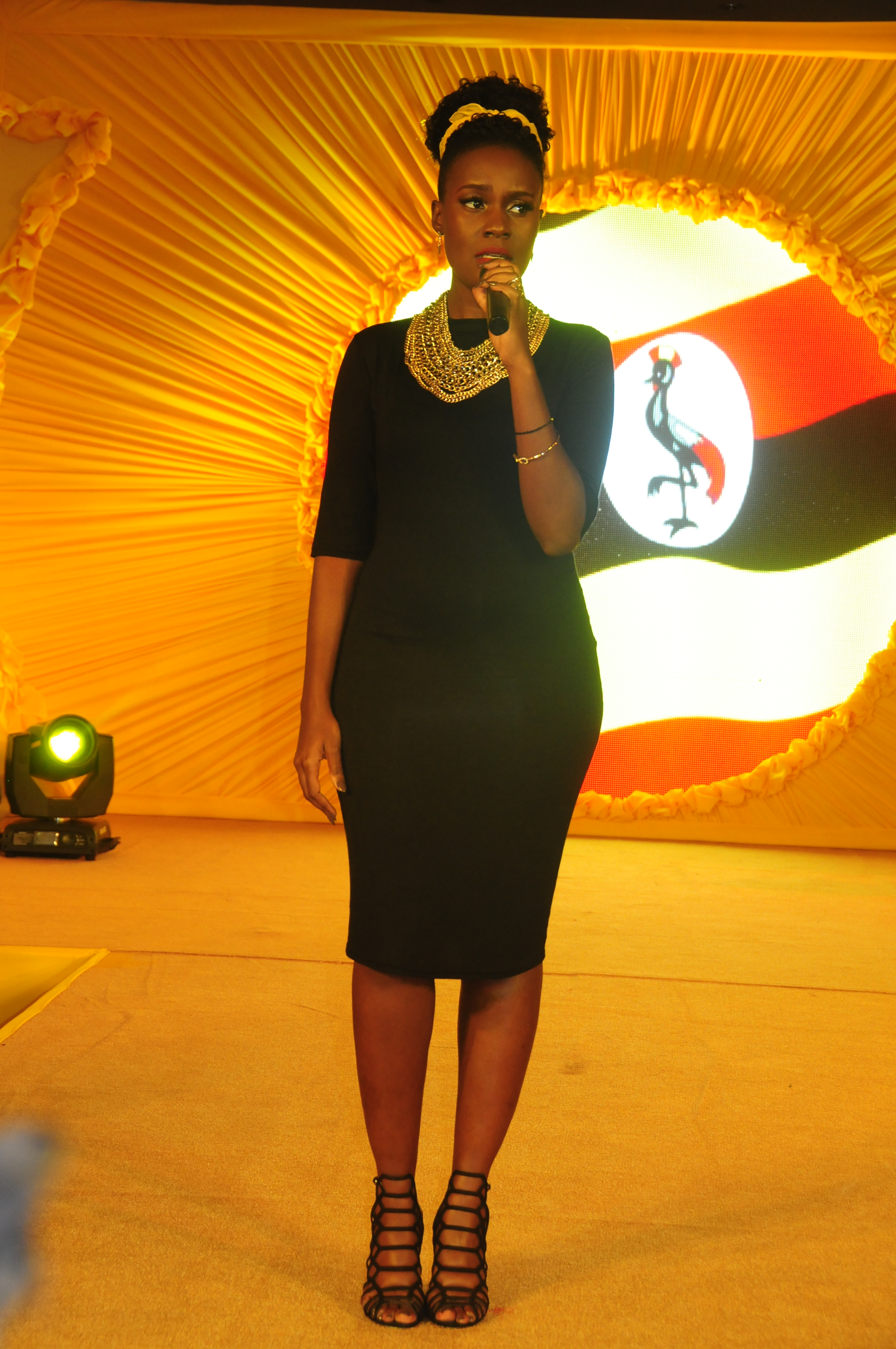
- Born: 27 November 1980 (age 45); Uganda
- Citizenship: Uganda
- Education: Namasagali College
- Occupations: Musician; actress; entertainer
- Notable credits: Tusker Project Fame; Kiwani
- Children: 2
- Parents: Prince (Omubiito) Gerald Philip Manyindo (father); Catherine Byabusa Kabasomi (mother)
- Relatives: Laura Kahunde (sister); Rukidi IV (cousin); Princess Elizabeth of Tooro (paternal aunt)
- Musical career
- Genres: Pop; R&B; Afrobeat
- Years active: 1998–present

Juliana Kanyomozi (born 27 November 1980) is a Ugandan pop musician, R&B and Afrobeat singer. She is commonly regarded as one of Uganda's most prominent music artists of all time.

== Early life and education ==
Juliana Kanyomozi was born on 27 November 1980 to Prince (Omubiito) Gerald Philip Manyindo Atwooki and Catherine Byabusa Kabasomi Abwooli (Omugo w'Omubiito Manyindo). She is Princess (Omubiitokati) of Tooro Kingdom (one of the four traditional kingdoms located within the borders of what is today Uganda). A granddaughter of King Rukidi III of Tooro 11th Omukama of Tooro, niece of the 12th Omukama of Tooro, Olimi III and first cousin of the 13th Omukama of Tooro, Rukidi IV. Her father was a drummer and her maternal grandmother was a vocalist. Juliana attended City Primary School currently Arya Primary School for her primary education. She then joined Bugema Secondary School for her O-Level education and then Namasagali College in Kamuli District for her high school education.

== Career ==
Juliana was the first female musician to win the Pearl of Africa Music Awards 'Artist of the Year' accolade. In 2008, she made her film debut in Henry Ssali's Kiwani: The Movie.

In March 2014, she signed with international cosmetics company Oriflame to be one of their East African brand ambassadors together with Lady JayDee of Tanzania and Jamila Mbugua of Kenya. Most recently, she has collaborated with Nigerian entertainer, Flavour.

In 2011 she was nominated in the Pan Africa Artiste or Group category at that year's Nigeria Entertainment Awards (NEA). In December 2015, she won a lifetime achievement award in Diva Awards Afrika. Between 2009 and 2013, she judged at the then popular Tusker Project Fame (TPF) talent search show. In 2010, she was the judge alongside other judges like Ian Mbugua from Kenya and Tanzania’s Hermes Joachim in addition to Gaetano Kagwa alongside other personalities who hosted the show.

== Personal life ==
In 2006, Juliana had a temporary romantic relationship with United States-based Ugandan boxer Kassim Ouma. She had a son, Keron Raphael Kabugo, who died in late July 2014. Her son was asthmatic, but the cause of death was not published. On Wednesday 12 May 2020, Juliana announced that she had given birth to a baby boy whom she named Taj fathered by rally driver Moses Lumala.

In 2013, Big Eye Magazine rated Juliana Kanyomozi one of the most beautiful Ugandan women of all-time.

== Awards ==
Year	Award	Category	Result
	Airtel Women of Substance Award	Music Category	Won
	HiPipo Music Awards	Best Female Afro-Beat Song – Eddiba	Won
	HiPipo Music Awards	Best Female Artist	Nominated
	HiPipo Music Awards	Best Artist on Social Media	Nominated
	HiPipo Music Awards	Best Female Afromix Song	Nominated
2013	Warid Women of Substance	Entertainment Award	Won
2013	HiPipo Music Awards	Best Female Artist	Nominated
2013	HiPipo Music Awards	Best Artist on Social Media	Nominated
2013	HiPipo Music Awards	Best Zouk Song	Nominated
2013	HiPipo Music Awards	Best R&B Song	Nominated
2012	Kora Awards	Best Female Artist East Africa "I Am Ugandan"	Won
2012	Super Talent Awards, Uganda	Most Gifted Artist	Won
2012	BEFFTA Awards, UK	Best International Afrobeats Act	Won
2012	HiPipo Charts	Best Afro Beat Act – "Sanyu Lyange"	Won
2012	HiPipo Charts	Best Video Act – "Sanyu Lyange"	Won
2012	HiPipo Charts	Specially Appreciated Hipipo Charts Female Artist	Won
2012	Kisima Awards	Best East African Collaboration – "Mpita Njia"	Nominated
2011	East African Music Awards	Best Female Artist – "Alive Again"	Won
2011	East African Music Awards	Best East African Collaboration – "Haturudi Nyuma"	Nominated
2011	Diva Music Awards Uganda	Afrobeat Diva – "Sanyu Lyange"	Won
2011	Diva Music Awards Uganda	Super Diva – "Alive Again"	Nominated
2011	Diva Music Awards Uganda	Exceptional Video– "Sanyu Lyange"	Nominated
2011	Diva Music Awards Uganda	Exceptional Song– "Omutima"	Nominated
2011	Diva Music Awards Uganda	R&B Diva – "Libe'esanyu"	Nominated
2011	Kisima Awards	Best East African	Nominated
2011	Kisima Awards	Song of The Year – "Haturudi Nyuma"	Nominated
2011	Museke Online African Music Awards New York	Best Female Artist	Nominated
2011	Museke Online African Music Awards New York	Best Soul/R&B Artist	Nominated
2011	Museke Online African Music Awards New York	Best East African Act	Nominated
2011	Nigeria Entertainment Awards	Pan African Artists – "Alive Again"	Nominated
2010	2010 Tanzania music awards	Best East African Song – "Haturudi Nyuma" with Kidum	Won
2010	Diva Awards Uganda	Best R&B Artist – "Kantambule Naawe"	Nominated
2010	Africa Music Awards	Pan African Artist – "Haturudi Nyuma"	Nominated
2010	Pearl of Africa Music Awards	Female Artist – "Kantambule Naawe"	Nominated
2009	African Music Awards	Best Female Act, Best East African Act	Nominated

2008	Pearl of Africa Music Awards	Artist of the Year & Best R&B Artiste/Group & Best Female Artist	Won
2008	Kisima Music Awards	Ugandan Song of the Year; (a) Afrobeat Song – "Diana"; Best Collaboration – Usiende Mbali	Nominated
2007	Pearl of Africa Music Awards	Best R&B Artiste/Group	Won
2007	Teenz Awards	Female Artist – "Kibaluma"	Nominated
2006	Pearl of Africa Music Awards	Best R&B artist/group	Won
2006	Tanzania Music Awards	Best Ugandan song ("mama mbire")	Won
2005	Pearl of Africa Music Awards	Best R&B Artists & Best Female Artist & Song of the Year – "Mama Mbiire" with Bobi Wine & Best R&B Single – "Nabikoowa"	Won
2005	Kora Awards	Best East African Song – "All I Wanna Do"	Nominated
2004	Pearl of Africa Music Awards	Best R&B Artists	Won

=== Won ===
- 2010 Tanzania music awards – Best East African Song – "Haturudi Nyuma" with Kidum
- 2010 Diva Awards Uganda – Best R&B Artist – "Kantambule Naawe"
- 2011 East African Music Awards – Best Female Artist – "Alive Again"
- 2011 Diva Music Awards Uganda – Afrobeat Diva – "Sanyu Lyange"
- 2016 Most Inspirational Song-Zzina Awards - "Woman"

=== Nominated ===
- 2010 Africa Music Awards – Pan African Artist – "Haturudi Nyuma"
- 2010 Pearl of Africa Music Awards – Female Artist – "Kantambule Naawe"
- 2011 East African Music Awards – Best East African Collaboration – "Haturudi Nyuma"
- 2011 Nigeria Entertainment Awards – Pan African Artists – "Alive Again"
- 2011 Museke Online African Music Awards New York – Best Female Artist, Best Soul/R&B Artist & Best East African Act
- 2011 Kisima Awards – Best East African /Song of The Year – "Haturudi Nyuma"
- 2011 Diva Awards Uganda – Super Diva, Exceptional Video, Exceptional Song, R&B Diva – "Alive Again, Sanyu Lyange, Omutima and Libe'esanyu"

== Film and television ==
Juliana Kanyomozi debuted her acting career in 2008 in a Ugandan crime thriller film, Kiwani: The Movie alongside Flavia Tumusiime, Hannington Bugingo and Allan Tumusiime. She was also a judge on East Africa's leading singing competition, Tusker Project Fame from 2009 to 2013. She was also one of the selected African musicians to represent in Coke Studio Africa.

=== Television ===
Year	TV Series	Role	Notes
2009–2013	Tusker Project Fame	Herself - Judge	Judge (Uganda)

=== Film ===
Year	Movie/Film	Role	Notes
2008	Kiwani: The Movie	Judith	Pam's (Flavia Tumusiime) Auntie, Cooperate lonely & victim of online dating scam
2014	Bullion		

== Albums ==
- Nabikowa (2005)
- Kanyimbe (2009)
- Bits & Pieces ( 2018)

== Singles & EPs ==
Tusker Malt Conversations (2023)

- Omwana
- Kibaluma
- Oli wa Maanyi
- Edibba
- Mundeke
- Kalibe Sanyu
- Alive Again
- I am Ugandan
- Nkyanoonya
- Malaika Wange
- Mundeke
- Tobanakutya
- Mukuume
- Nkulinze
- Ondage Omukwano
- Sayi It
- Omutima Guluma
- Nakazadde
- Ndibulungi
- Ni wewe
- Kalibatanya
- Sanyu Lyange
- Diana

== Collaborations ==
- Juliana ft. Bobi Wine-Taata Wa Baana Yani and Maama Mbiire
- Juliana ft. Sweet Kid - Sirinaayo Mulala
- Juliana ft. Klear Kut- All I Wanna Know.
- Juliana ft. Bushoke a Tanzania Artist in Usiende Mbali
- Juliana ft. Radio and Weasel - Engule
- Juliana ft. GNL Zamba - Wololo
- Juliana ft. Jay Ghartey - Love You Better
- Juliana ft. Jay Ghartey- My lady (Remix)
- Juliana ft. Hope Mukasa - Ensonga Semasonga
- Juliana ft. Kidum -Hatutrudi Nyuma
- Juliana ft. Vampino, Keko & Cindy- Kwe Kunya Kunya(remix)
- Juliana ft. Alicios -Mpita Njia
- Juliana ft. Benon Mugumbya & Tickie Tah - Munsi Yange
- Juliana ft. Peter Miles - Oja
- Juliana ft. Mesach Semakula - Wesigame Kunze
- Juliana ft. Female artists -Webale
- Juliana ft. All Stars - A Little bit of Love
- Juliana ft. Cindy - Maama
- Juliana ft. All Stars - the Ugandan Millennium Song

== See also ==
- Alicios Theluji
- Bobi Wine
- King Oyo
- Iryn Namubiru
- Winnie Nwagi
- Vivian Mimi
- Afrigo Band
- Jemimah Sanyu
- List of Ugandan musicians
