= Alex Muhangi =

Ugandan comedian (born 1985)

Alex Emix Muhangi
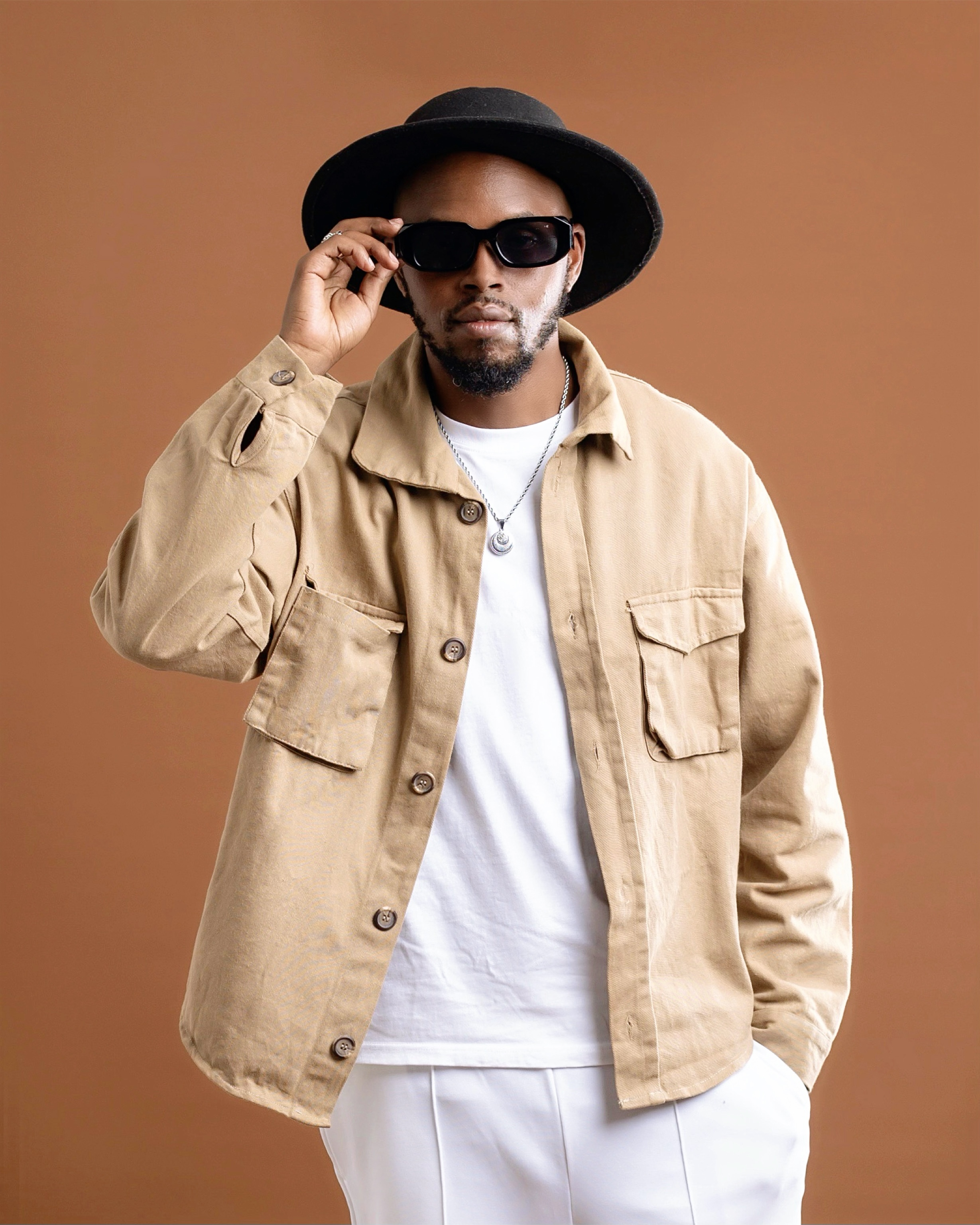
- Alex Muhangi
- Born: 9 October 1985 (age 41); Rukungiri, Uganda
- Education: Bachelors Degree in Mass Communication; Diploma in Journalism & Mass Communication; Diploma in Sound Engineering; Makerere University; UMCAT; Academy of Sound Engineering Johannesburg South Africa
- Partner: Prim Asiimwe
- Children: Jehu Muhangi

Comedy career
- Years active: Since 2009
- Medium: Stand-up, television
- Genres: Alternative comedy, Topical

Alex Emix Muhangi, commonly known as Alex Muhangi, is a Ugandan Comedian, actor sound engineer, director and host of the comedy show, Comedy Store Uganda. He was listed as one of the top 10 Ugandan comedians and personalities in 2016 and 2017 by New Vision and as one of the pioneers of standup comedy in the English language in Uganda.

Muhangi went on a world tour in 2014 and performed in Rwanda, South Africa, Zambia, Malawi, Zimbabwe, South Sudan, Kenya (Churchill Show), Tanzania, Rwanda, Canada, Australia, Somalia, UK, Germany, Norway, Sweden, Nigeria, Ghana, Turkey, UAE, China as well as appearing on The Improv in the United States.

== Career ==
Muhangi worked at 96.9FM Radio Rukungiri and 89.1FM Vision Fm Mbarara, both in western Uganda as a radio presenter during his high school days. He then started his own record label Masters Music in 2014 in Kampala where he remains the CEO and sound engineer.

In 2009, Muhangi auditioned for StandUp Uganda, a DStv campaign search for the 'next top comic' where he finished as the 2nd Runner-up. He had just been driving by Kimathi Avenue when he saw people lining up for auditions which he thought were acting auditions. He then decided to also audition because he loved acting and had not prepared any jokes. He was asked to tell a joke which he did and suddenly became a contender and later a 2nd Runner up.

In 2010, Alex Muhangi started a comedy group "The Crackers" which had a number one television show "Mic Check" on Cable.

He then co-founded Jazz Comedy. In February 2016, he created Comedy Store Uganda, a weekly entertainment show in Uganda, which he hosts every Thursday at UMA Lugogo in Kampala.

Alex Muhangi has worked with both Ugandan and foreign international comedians, actors and other celebrities including: Anne Kansiime, Daniel Ndambuki, Teacher Mpamire, Eric Omondi, Akite Agnes and others. Muhangi has hosted a number of events in Uganda and abroad including the Club Music and Video Awards (CMVA) alongside Crystal Newman and Ellah, his own Comedy Store Uganda since 2016, and Arthur and Kansiime Live in 2016 in Kigali.

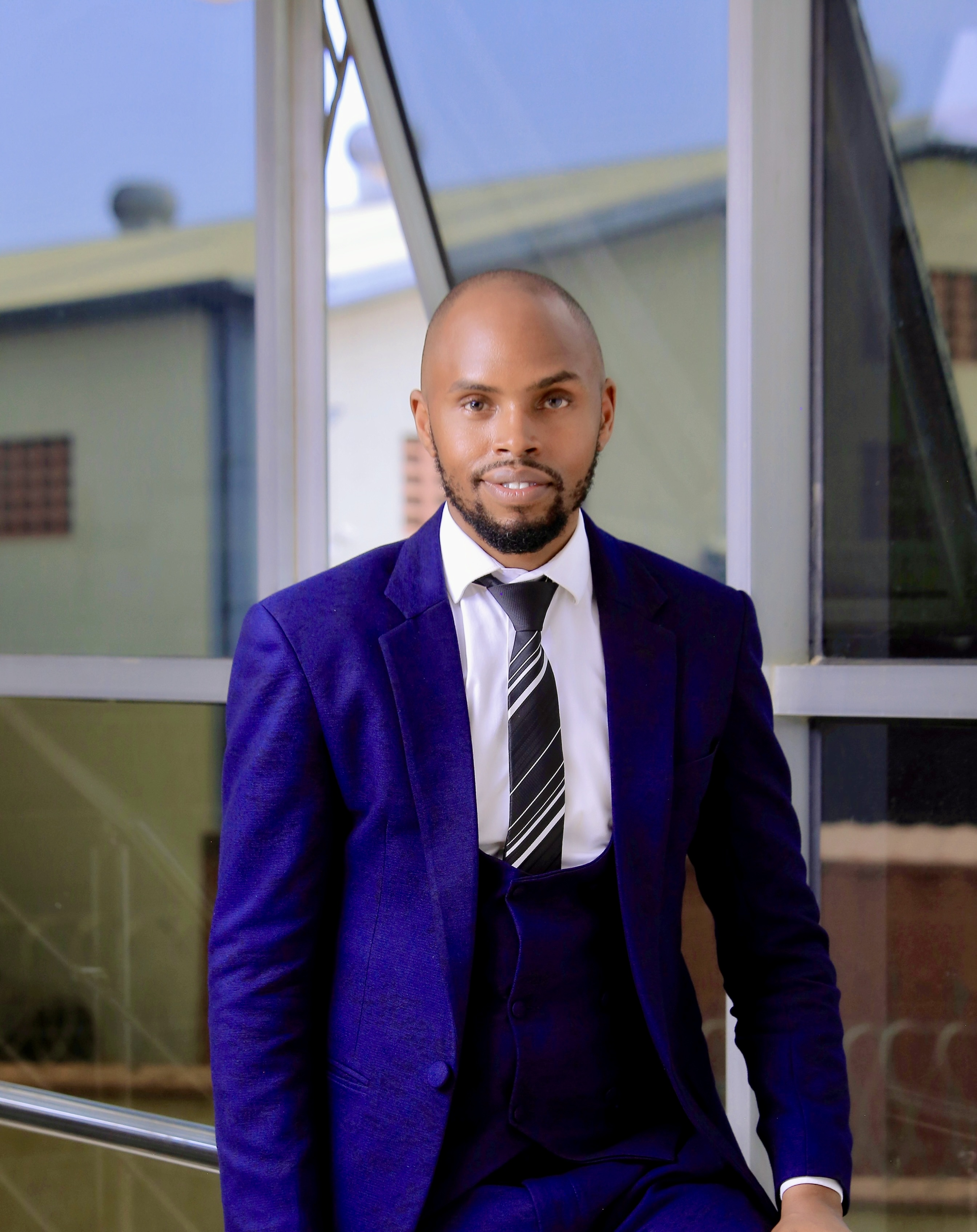

== Personal life ==
Alex Muhangi has a daughter, Jehu Muhangi with his partner and radio presenter Prim Asiimwe Muhangi is a member of the Anglican Church of Uganda.

== Filmography ==
Year	TV Show/Film	Role	Notes
Since 2016	Comedy Store Uganda	Himself	Host

== Awards ==
Awards
Year	Award	Category	Result
	East Africa Choice Awards	Best Comedian	Won
2017	Abryanz Style and Fashion Awards (ASFAs)	Male Most Stylish/Dressed Celebrity (Uganda)	Nominated
2017	Pearl of Africa Fashion Awards	Best Fashionable Comedian	Won
