= Leila Kalanzi Kachapizo =

Ugandan radio and TV personality (born 1979)

Leilah Kalanzi
- Born: Leilah Kalanzi; 5 December 1979; Nakivubo Mews, Uganda
- Occupations: Actress; Comedian; Radio presenter; Television presenter; Hairdresser
- Employers: Sanyuka TV; Bukedde; Dembe FM; Radio Simba; CBS Radio
- Organization: Bakayimbira Drama Actors
- Known for: Birungi ssi birungi
- Children: 3

Leilah Kalanzi, also known by her stage name "Kachapizo", is an actress, hairdresser, radio presenter and comedian. She is a media personality, recognized for her voice work in radio and television adverts. Kachapizo was born on 5 December 1979, in Nakivubo Mews, Uganda. She is the current host of "Birungi ssi birungi" a TV Show on Sanyuka TV Uganda. Leilah has worked with various media outlets as a radio & TV presenter on Bukedde, Sanyuka TV, and Dembe FM of Nation Media Group among a few others.

== Career ==
Kachapizo was born to a single mother, Hajjat Hamida Nalwoga, and had four siblings. Kachapizo hails from Masaka district, Uganda; she attended St. Jude Primary School in Kampala and later studied at Pride Academy, where she discovered her passion for drama and acting. It was during her time at Pride Academy that she was noticed by Charles Senkubuge, the founder of Bakayimbira Drama Actors, who recruited her into the group.

Kachapizo's career in entertainment grew steadily as she toured with the Bakayimbira group to many parts of Uganda and countries overseas, including a trip to Germany. She began working as a presenter at Radio Simba and later joined CBS Radio, a popular station in Buganda the central region of Uganda.

Leilah is married to an undisclosed man who is also not the biological Dad to her only 3 biological children namely; Nampijja Hairah, Namatovu Hayat and Matovu Hilaldin. Kachapizo's father, Hajj Abdul Kalanzi, died 23 October 2018, after battling an undisclosed illness. He was buried in Nkoowe village, Wakiso district.
