= Sanyuka TV Uganda =

Ugandan television network

Sanyuka TV
- Country: Uganda
- Headquarters: Next Media Park

Programming
- Languages: English, Luganda
- Picture format: 1080i HDTV (downscaled to 16:9 576i for the SDTV feed), Colour

Ownership
- Owner: Next Media Services
- Sister channels: NBS Television

History
- Launched: 27 September 2018; 8 years ago

Links
- Website: https://sanyukatv.ug

Sanyuka TV is a Ugandan television network based in Kampala, Uganda.

== Location ==
Its headquarters is located at Next Media Park, Plot 13, summit view Road, Kampala, Uganda.

== Overview ==
The channel was launched in September 2018. It started broadcasting on 10 September 2018. The station is known for its focus on Ugandan sports, also has a series of educational-entertainment movies, sports, youth and entertainment shows. Each week it shows one English Premier League game.
