= Watoto Children's Choir =

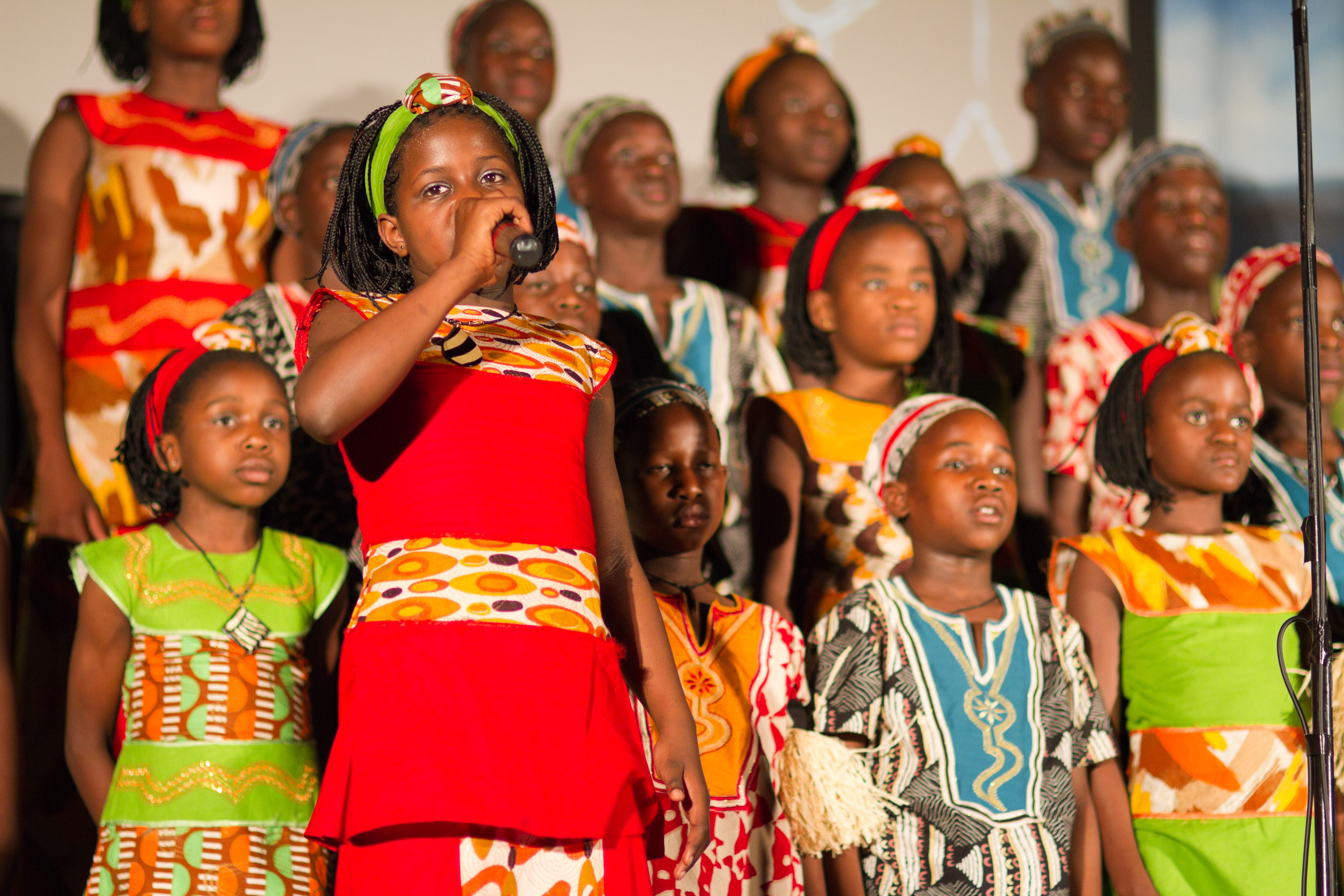

Background information
- Origin: Uganda
- Instruments: Drums, a cappella singing
- Years active: 1994–present
- Label: Watoto Publishing
- Website: watoto.com

The Watoto Children's Choir is a group of African children's choirs based in Kampala, Uganda, at Watoto Church. They tour internationally. Each choir is composed of about eighteen to twenty-two children from Uganda. Their tours raise money as well as awareness for the Watoto orphanages in Kampala.

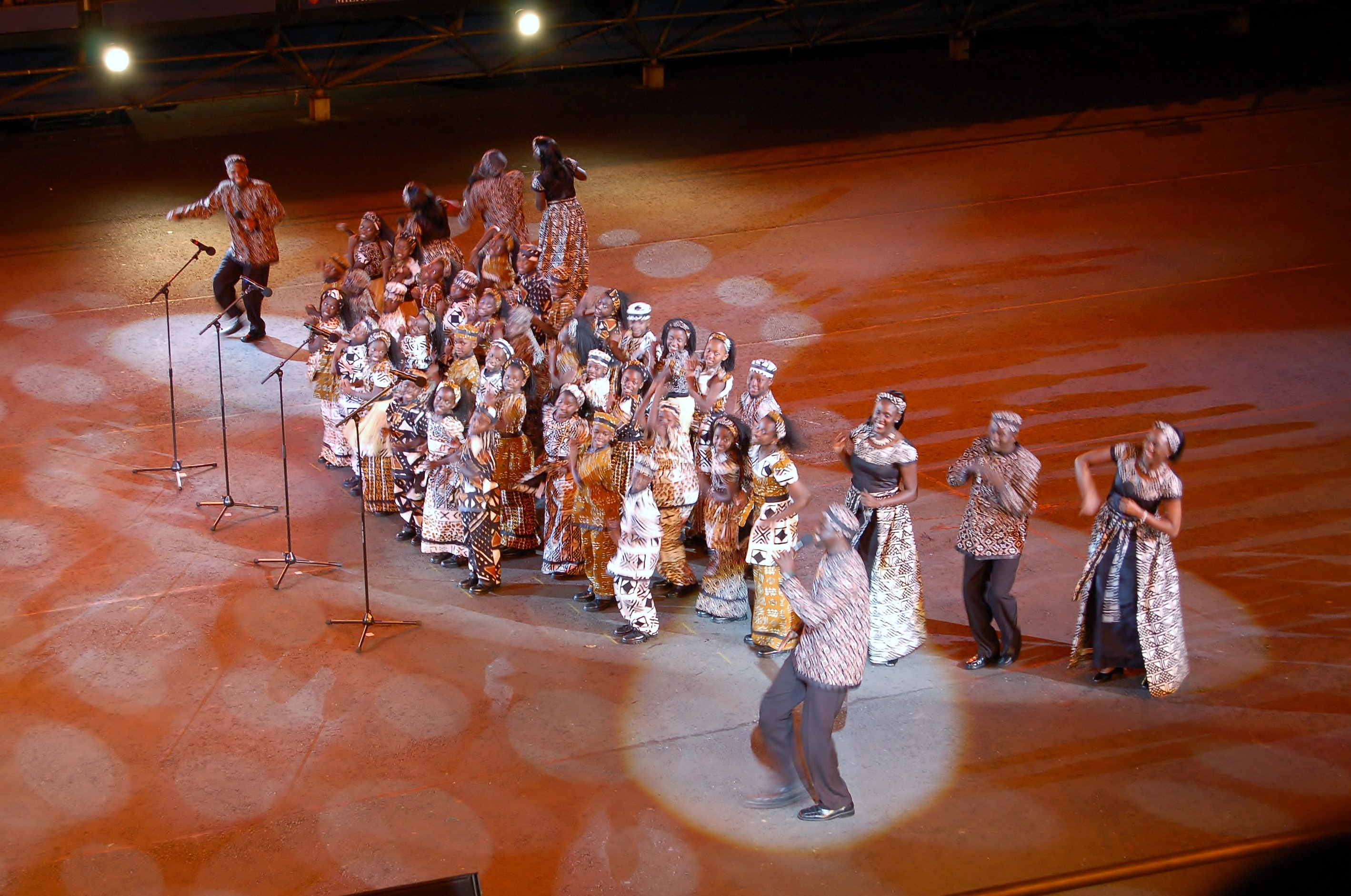
A Watoto Children's Choir performing at the Edinburgh Military Tattoo in Scotland in 2006

“Watoto” means "Children" in Swahili. The choir is made up of children who have lost one or both parents, often as a result of AIDS. Watoto operates six choirs, which tour Asia, Australia, Europe, and North and South America. The choirs travel with a team of adult chaperones who look after the children and also manage the day-to-day logistics of the tour on the road. The choir has toured Asia, Australia, Brazil, Canada, China, and the United States.

Their ‘Concerts of Hope’ are a blend of African rhythms, contemporary gospel music, creative dance and story-telling. They have released several albums including “Mambo Number 5”, “Beautiful Africa” and “What Is Love”. Their latest album "Wherever You Will Go” features live music played throughout the concerts on most of the tours.

The Watoto Children's Choirs have performed with award-winning artists including Chris Tomlin, Israel Houghton and Martin Smith. They have also been invited to the UK Houses of Parliament, the Canadian and Australian Parliaments as well as the White House.
