= Teacher Mpamire =

Ugandan teacher and comedian (born 1983)

Herbert Mendo Ssegujja
- Born: Herbert Mendo Ssegujja; September 27, 1983 (age 43); Mukono, Uganda
- Other name: Teacher Mpamire
- Education: Greenlight High School; Makerere University; American Comedy Institute

Herbert Mendo Ssegujja (born 27 September 1983), is a Ugandan comedian and actor, who performs under the name Teacher Mpamire. He is most famous for mimicking the Ugandan president, Yoweri Kaguta Museveni.

== Background and education ==
Ssegujja was born in Mukono Town, on 27 September 1983. After attending Bbowa Primary School, he was admitted to Greenlight High School, in Zana, along Kampala–Entebbe Road. He obtained his diploma from Greenlight High School.

He holds a Bachelor of Education degree from Makerere University, Uganda's oldest and largest public university. He was sponsored by President Yoweri Museveni to study in the Program in Comedy Performing and Writing at the American Comedy Institute, in New York City.

== Career ==
=== As a teacher ===
In real life, Ssegujja is a teacher at Standard High School in Zana, approximately 10 kilometres (6 mi), southwest of the city centre of Kampala. While there, he had the opportunity to teach alongside Arthur Mpamire, his former European History teacher at Greenlight High, on whom he based his stage name and character.

=== As a comedian ===
His performances have seen him stage shows in Uganda, Zambia, Malawi, Kenya, Tanzania and other African countries. In 2016, Teacher Mpamire was named "discovery of year" at the Africa Youth Awards held in Accra, Ghana. He is also part of the Fun Factory Uganda cast in their weekly comedy shows at the National Theatre, in Kampala.

== Awards and nominations ==
Year	Awards	Category	Recipient	Outcome
2015	Youth Expo Stand-up Comedy Awards	Best Comedian	Teacher Mpamire	Won
2016	Africa Youth Awards	Discovery of the Year	Teacher Mpamire	Won
2016	Rising Star Awards	Comedian of the year	Teacher Mpamire	Won
2016	Starqt Awards	Comedian of the Year	Teacher Mpamire	Won

== Wardrobe ==
Ssegujja has some of his comedic attire custom made from designer in the Democratic Republic of the Congo.

== Family ==
Herbert Ssegujja is engaged to his long-time girlfriend, Carol Barekye. The customary introduction ceremony to her parents was held in December 2016.
