= Anne Kansiime =

Ugandan entertainer, comedian, and actress (born 1986)

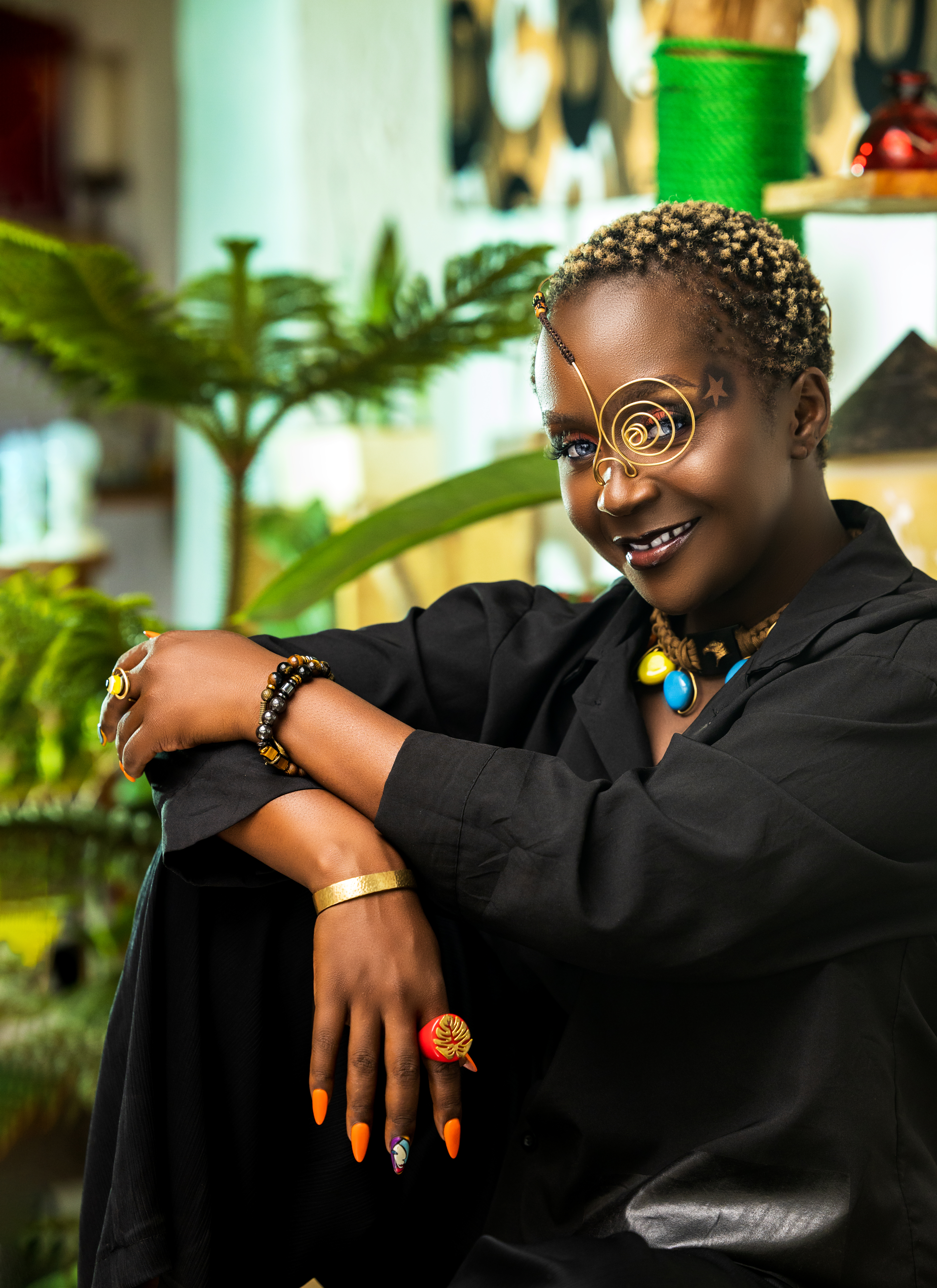
- Born: Anne Kansiime Kubiryaba; 13 April 1986 (age 40); Mparo, Rukiga, Uganda
- Education: Makerere University (Bachelor of Arts in Social Science)
- Occupations: Entertainer, actress, comedian, writer
- Years active: 2007–present
- Known for: entertainment-comedy and children's music
- Title: "Africa's Queen of Comedy"
- Spouse: Gerald Ojok (m. 2013; div. 2017)
- Partner: Chad Gilbert Larson (2026 - Present)
- Children: 1
- Website: www.kansiimeanne.ug

Anne Kansiime Kubiryaba (born 13 April 1986), better known as Anne Kansiime, is a Ugandan entertainer, comedian, and actress. She has been referred to as "Africa's Queen of Comedy" by some African media outlets.

== Background and education ==
She was born in Mparo in present-day Rukiga District, in the Western Region of Uganda. At the time of her birth, Mparo was part of Kabale District. Her father was a retired banker, and her mother was a housewife. Kansiime attended Kabale Primary School. For her O-Level and A-Level education, she studied at Bweranyangi Girls' Senior Secondary School in Bushenyi. She holds a Bachelor of Arts in Social Science from Makerere University.

== Career ==
Beginning in 2007, while still an undergraduate at Makerere University, Kansiime began to participate in drama skits acted by the theatre group Theatre Factory, who played at the Uganda National Theatre in Kampala's central business district. When Theatre Factory disintegrated, she joined Fun Factory, that replaced it. The group plays every Thursday evening. The best skits were broadcast on NTV Uganda in the Barbed Wire TV show that later became U-Turn. She partnered with Brian Mulondo as a Taxi interview conductor in the MiniBuzz series and provided comic video dramatizations of topical issues that random passengers discussed. According to recorded interviews that she gave in 2014, Anne began posting some of her sketch comedy skits on YouTube. She received positive feedback and that encouraged her to post more videos. Her screen breakthrough came when Citizen TV from neighboring Kenya offered her a slot to produce, star and present a comedy show once a week. That is how she came up with the Don't Mess With Kansiime comedy show. As of November 2014, her YouTube channel had amassed more than 15 million views. Her YouTube videos receive thousands of views and she has appeared on BBC Focus on Africa. She has played to packed houses in Blantyre, Gaborone, Kigali, Kuala Lumpur, Lagos, Lilongwe, London, Lusaka and Harare.

== Other considerations ==
Even amongst various acting commitments, Kansiime has continued performing and touring as a standup comedian. Kansiime's comedy style tends to focus on aspects of her personal life. "I like talking about things that are going on in life, because that's always going to be different and original," she says. She was married to Gerald Ojok, a native Acholi. In Nov 2017, they went through with a divorce. They had no children from the marriage. At that time, she was in the process of compiling an album of Children's songs, which she intended to release later in 2015.

== Filmography ==
Year	Movie/Film/TV Series	Role	Notes
2018	Girl From Mparo	Anne Kansiime	Sitcom
2014	Don't Mess With Kansiime	Kansiime – Protagonist	
2022	Kanseeme		Reality show
2024	Juniors Drama Club	Ka Glucose	sitcom

== Awards ==
- Honorary recognition by the SIIKETV Rising Star Academy Awards, the "Queen of Comedy" 2018
- Comedy YouTube Sub-Saharan Africa Creator Award 2016
- Outstanding Female Comedian 2016
- Teeniez Funniest Comedian 2016
- African Entertainment Awards USA, Best Comedian's Award 2015
- Rising Star – Comedian of the Year 2015
- African Oscar Award for favorite comedian 2015
- Nollywood & African People's Choice Award for favorite comedian 2015
- YouTube silver play button 2015
- AIRTEL Women of Substance Awards 2014
- BEFFTA 2013 (Best Comedian) Winner
- Lagos International Festival 2013 (Best Actress) Winner
- Social Media Awards (Favorite Celebrity) winner
- African Social Awards Malaysia (ASAM) – 2013

== Charity ==
Anne Kansiime through her charity organisation, The Kansiime Foundation, supports needy but bright children by keeping them in school. She now supports over 35 children both in Primary and Secondary school.

== Business ==
Anne Kansiime is also into leisure business. She runs Kansiime Backpackers and it is located on the shores of lake Bunyonyi, conveniently overseeing the lake Bunyonyi in Kabale District, Uganda.

== Personal Life ==
In 2026, Kansiime was reported to be in a relationship with Chad Gilbert Larson, a co-founder of M-KOPA. In May 2026, she publicly celebrated Larson's birthday, sharing photographs of the two together and referring to him as her partner.
