= Ishusho ya Papa =

Rwandan comedy television series

- Genre: Drama
- Created by: Misago Nelly Wilson
- Written by: Mutiganda wa Nkunda; Kirezi Gaju Henry
- Directed by: Ibrahim Kwizera,Dusabe Musine Israel
- Presented by: ZACU TV
- Starring: Clesse Jean Marc; Irakoze Ariane Vanessa; Ishimwe Yves; Gihozo Nshuti Mireille; Umurerwa Clear; Umutoniwase Joselyne; Mugisha Neilla Bernice; Murekezi Lucky; Manzi Prince
- Country of origin: Rwanda
- Original language: rw
- No. of seasons: 4
- No. of episodes: 52

Production
- Producer: Misago Nelly Wilson
- Production location: Rwanda
- Cinematography: Udahemuka Louis, Shingiro Bora
- Editors: Mutuzo Innocent; Abimana Olivier
- Camera setup: Single Camera
- Running time: 26 Minutes
- Production company: Zacu Entertainment LTD

Original release
- Network: Zacu TV
- Release: 2023

Related
- The Bishop's Family, Shuwa Dilu, Kaliza wa Kalisa

Ishusho ya Papa is a Rwandan drama television series produced by Misago Nelly Wilson under Zacu Entertainment, a local production firm that was known for its series like Seburikoko, City Maid, Indoto, The Bishop's Family, and Kaliza Wa Kalisa. It was directed by Kwizera Ibrahim, the series began airing on Zacu TV in September 2023 and consists of four seasons.

== Cast ==
- Clesse Jean Marc as Jean Luc
- Irakoze Ariane Vanessa as Olive
- Ishimwe Yves as Fabrice
- Gihozo Nshuti Mireille as Gihozo
- Umurerwa Clear as Gasaro
- Umutoniwase Joselyne as Vanessa
- Mugisha Neilla Bernice as Meranda
- Murekezi Lucky as Manager
- Manzi Prince as Ngabo

== Synopsis ==
Jean Luc, a 30-year-old man from Belgium, has never met his Rwandan father. When his mother falls ill, he travels to Rwanda to find him, armed with only a portrait and the name of the place where his parents met. Surprisingly, Bonheur speaks Kinyarwanda, making communication easy. However, things get complicated when he meets Olive, a beautiful fisherwoman, and develops romantic feelings for her.

Beginning in season 3, Nathalie takes over the search for her birth father in Rwanda. However, her quest for truth leads her to dangerous individuals focused on making money from their schemes.
