= Niyoyita Roger =

Rwandan content creator and producer

- Born: Niyoyita Roger; Kigali, Rwanda
- Education: University of Rwanda/ Media, Art and Human Sciences
- Occupations: Producer, content creator, writer
- Years active: 2009–present
- Television: Seburikoko, City Maid, Indoto, EJO SI KERA
- Awards: Rwanda Movies awards

Niyoyita Roger is a Rwandan television producer. His father operated a movie theater in Ruhengeri, Northern Province, where Niyoyita Roger began his cinematic career as a young man.

He was instructed to see as many films as he could at the cinema before choosing the best ones to be screened. In order to expand on this expertise and interest, he chose to enter the National University of Rwanda's Art and Media Faculty in 2000. He is currently a young filmmaker who has acted in a few regional productions.

== Career ==
The Bishop's Family

In 2022, Roger wrote and directed The Bishop's Family, the series was premiered on the launch of ZACU TV on October 1, 2022, and began airing on October 3 when the TV officially started its programme. The Bishop's Family has 4 seasons and a total of 52 episodes, each with 26 minutes.

Synopsis

The Bishop's Family recounts the story of a man, Bishop Dan, who is an religious leader in his community. He is a proponent of interfaith dialogue and therefore close to other religious authorities, including Imam Bilal and Pastor Joseph. Serving God and helping people has always been his goal. He regularly welcomes community members into his office to listen to their problems, hear their confessions, give them advice, or to help them. On the other hand, his wife, Jane, is less spiritual. She owns a successful beauty salon which doubles as a couple therapy and “new age” weight loss consultancy. She's the breadwinner of the family, and has always financially supported her husband, their children, as well as the church activities. Within the community, Jane is often viewed negatively by other residents. Unsurprisingly, she also provokes some jealousy and envy.

Jane and her family have experienced blackmailing, manipulation, and violence.

Shuwa Dilu

In 2024, Roger directed his first sitcom series, Shuwa Dilu, which started airing on Zacu TV in June, 2024, starred the most popular comedians in Rwanda namely Niyitegeka Gratien, Benimana Ramadhan, and Nsabimana Eric.

The series began airing on Zacu TV in June 2024 and consists of two seasons, with two more planned for production. It was directed by Roger Niyoyita and starred the prominent comedians Niyitegeka Gratien as Superi, Ramadhan Benimana as Waxi, and Eric Nsabimana as Londoni.

Synopsis

Shuwa Dilu tells the story of Superi, Waxi, and London living in a rented house where the house serves as the show's central hub, with various rooms and spaces becoming the backdrop for different scenes and comedic situations. The living room, kitchen, bedrooms, and makeshift massage room are stages for the roommates’ hilarious encounters, misunderstandings, and attempts to navigate their unique living arrangements. As the action occasionally ventures into the surrounding neighborhood, it allows for interactions with recurring supporting characters, like the neighboring houseboys and house girls who frequently find themselves caught up in London's shenanigans.

Kaliza Wa Kalisa

Kaliza wa Kalisa is an adaptation drama TV series originated from India as Kareena Kareena, produced by Zee Entertainment. Kaliza wa Kalisa was created by Misago Nelly Wilson through adaptation, produced through Zacu Entertainment Ltd. The series began airing on ZACU TV on August 27, 2024. The series consists of 2 seasons and continuing producing, directed by Niyoyita Roger.

Synopsis

Kaliza Wa Kalisa recounts the story of a Kaliza, a young and funny woman, who moves from Rusizi to Kigali to chase her dreams. Running out of time to find a job, she uses her charm to navigate city life. She lands an interview at Umusambi Cosmetics, but the job requires her to be married. Desperately, she lied to get hired. Just as she thinks her secret is safe, she covers for a friend at Switi Radio and becomes famous. How long can Kaliza keep up the lies and balance her double life?

== Accomplishments | Awards |Nominations ==
- Roger directed the TV series The Bishop's Family, which was later dubbed in French and aired on A+ Afrique, a Canal+ owned television in Ivory Coast.

- Roger was nominated among the best directors in the Rwanda International Movie Awards 2023.

- The Bishop's Family, which was directed by Niyoyita Roger, was also nominated and awarded the best TV series in East Africa in RIMA awards in 2023.
