= TV1 =

TV1, TV One or TVOne may refer to the following television networks and channels:

- TV1 (Australian TV channel)
- TV1 (Bosnia and Herzegovina), now O Kanal
- TV1 (Canadian TV channel)
- TVOne Cyprus, now Omega
- TV1 (Estonian TV channel)
- TV1 (India), replaced by Jai Telangana TV
- TV1 (Lithuania)
- TV1 (Malaysian TV network)
- TV1 (Portugal), a proposed Portuguese television channel
- TV1 (Tanzanian TV channel)
- TV1 (Rwandan TV channel)
- TV 1 (Sri Lankan TV channel)
- TV One (American TV channel)
- tvOne (Indonesian TV network)
- TVOne Canada, a former Urdu language channel
- Norsk TV1, Norway
- Yle TV1, Finland
- One (Australian TV channel), now 10 Bold
- One (Canadian TV channel)
- One (German TV channel)
- One (Maltese TV channel)
- VRT 1, formerly Eén, Belgium
- SABC 2, formerly TV1, South Africa
- SVT1, formerly TV1, Sweden
- M1 (Hungarian TV channel) or Magyar TV1, news channel of the Hungarian MTVA
- TRT 1, the first Turkish national channel, formerly using TV1 as logo
- TVNZ 1, formerly TV One, New Zealand

== See also ==
- 1TV (disambiguation)
- Channel 1 (disambiguation)
