= Channel 1 =

Channel One or channel 1 may refer to:

== Television networks and channels ==
- Channel One (Albania)
- 10 Bold, an Australian television channel formerly known as One
- Channel 1 (Bangladeshi TV channel)
- BNT 1—Bulgaria
- One (Canadian TV channel)
- CCTV-1—China
- Canal 1—Colombia
- Dubai One, Middle East and North Africa
- TF1, French flagship television channel from TF1 Group
- Das Erste, German flagship channel from ARD
- One (German TV channel)
- Channel 1 (Iran)
- RTÉ One, Irish flagship television channel from RTÉ
- Channel 1 (Israel)
- Rai 1, Italian flagship television channel from Rai
- One (Maltese TV channel)
- Azteca Uno, a television network in Mexico using virtual channel 1
- C1 Television—Mongolia
- NPO 1, Dutch flagship television channel from the Nederlandse Publieke Omroep
  - NPO 1 Extra, a Dutch television channel
- Channel 1 (North American TV), a defunct channel last occupying the spectrum between 44 and 50 MHz
- Channel One (Russia)
- Programme One, a defunct flagship television channel from the All-Soviet State Television and Radio Broadcasting Company
- Channel 1 (Syrian TV channel)
- Channel One (British and Irish TV channel), a defunct British television channel
- BBC One, British flagship television channel from the BBC
- DD 1, flagship TV channel of the Indian public broadcaster Doordarshan
- NY1, a channel in New York—USA
- One TV, a supposed rebranding to TV5 (which was cancelled in 2020)—Philippines
- TV1 (Malaysian TV network), a Malaysian television channel
- Norsk TV1, a defunct Norwegian television channel
- TV1 (Portugal), a proposed Portuguese television channel
- VTV1—Vietnam
- Fiji One, a Fijian television channel
- Channel 1 (Egypt), an Egyptian television channel
- TV SLO 1, a Slovenian television channel
- HRT 1, a Croatian television channel
- TVCG 1, a Montenegrin television channel
- BBS 1, a Bhutanese television channel
- tvOne (Indonesian TV network), an Indonesian television news channel
- SRF 1, a Swiss German-language television channel
- RTS Un, a Swiss French-language television channel
- RSI La 1, a Swiss Italian-language television channel
- ORF eins, an Austrian television channel
- VRT 1, a Belgian Dutch-language television channel
- La Une, a Belgian French-language television channel
- TVR 1, a Romanian television channel
- BFBS 1, a defunct television channel of the British Forces Broadcasting Service
- KNR1, a Greenlandic television channel
- TV1 Samoa, a Samoan television channel
- RTSH 1, an Albanian television channel
- TBC 1, a Tanzanian television channel
- ZNBC TV1, a Zambian television channel
- KBC Channel 1, a Kenyan television channel
- BHT1, a Bosnian television channel
- SBC 1, a Seychellois television channel
- DFF1, a defunct German television channel

== Other uses ==
- Channel One (band), an Irish rock band
- Channel One Studios, a recording studios in Kingston, Jamaica
- "Channel One", two techno releases by Juan Atkins
- Channel One News, a school television program in the United States

== See also ==
- Channel 1 branded TV stations in the United States
- Channel 1 virtual TV stations in the United States
- TV1 (disambiguation), includes TV One and TVOne
- 1TV (disambiguation)
