= Pearl of Africa Star Search =

Ugandan Reality TV Show

- Genre: Talent show
- Created by: Talent Africa Group
- Presented by: Bryan Sabiiti Mckenzie
- Judges: Season 1: Joanita Kawalya; Navio; Cindy Sanyu; Bismark Amumpire
- Country of origin: Uganda
- Original languages: English, Swahili, Luganda
- No. of seasons: 1
- No. of episodes: 12 episodes

Production
- Executive producer: Aly Allibhai
- Running time: 45minutes
- Production company: Talent Africa Group

Original release
- Network: NBS Television (Uganda)
- Release: 15 May – 8 August 2021

Pearl of Africa Star Search Season 1 is the first season of the Ugandan reality TV show. It was broadcast on NBS Television from 15 May 2021 to 8 August 2021 and was sponsored by The Pearl of Africa Star Search MTN, Coca-Cola Uganda, NBS TV, Talent Africa, Radiant, Graphic Systems, House of DJs, Uganda Talent Management Association, TAG Studios, Uganda Musicians Association and Uganda Tourism Board. The winner earned a grand prize package worth UGX 60,000,000 including a cash prize, recording contract from TAG studios, Professional artist management and PR, collaborations, destination trips and the paid role of Tourism Ambassador. It was won by Sandra Nansambu.

== Judges ==
- Joanita Kawalya
- Navio
- Cindy Sanyu
- Bismark Amumpire

== Jury Members ==
- Abby Mukiibi Nkaaga
- Moses Matovu
- Lydia Jazmine
- Suzan Kerunen
- Spice Diana

== Voice coach ==
- John Kay the writer

== Auditions ==
=== Preliminary auditions ===
The competition has two rounds of auditions. The first round was an open call for virtual auditions that attracted 2000 submissions from all over the country sent via the website and WhatsApp number.

=== Studio auditions ===
The Studio auditions were second round of auditions and were physically held at Talent Africa Group's studios, giving the 50 selected contestants the opportunity to show the judges. Contestants are grouped into huddles of 5 each, the 20 contestants have started the regional retreats from which 8 contestants(2 per region) will be dropped, leaving 12 who'll make it to the bootcamp.

== Episodes ==
Series	Episodes	Originally released		
Series	Episodes	First released	Last released	Network
1	12	15 May 2021	8 August 2021	NBS Television

=== Season 1 (2021) ===
No. overall	No. in season	Title	Original release date
1	1	"Pilot"	15 May 2021
With over 2000 virtual submissions sent through WhatsApp & the official website, 150 auditions are shortlisted by a jury. The Judges then select the best 50 out of the 150, that will be called for physical auditions.
2	2	"Auditions"	26 May 2021
2000 virtual auditions were submitted but only 50 were selected for the physical auditions with Judges. The Top 20 contestants are unveiled in the pilot Episode.
3	3	"Eastern Regional Tour"	8 June 2021
5 contestants representing Eastern Uganda travel to the east on a regional tour with our Judges Cindy Sanyu and Bismac Amumpaire for a series of musical and tourism challenges that will determine the 3 that will progress to the boot camp stage.
4	4	"Northern Regional Tour"	13 June 2021
5 contestants representing Northern Uganda travel to the North on a regional tour with Suzan Kerunen and Bismac Amumpaire for a series of musical and tourism challenges that will determine the 3 that will progress to the bootcamp stage.
5	5	"Western Regional Tour"	20 June 2021
5 contestants representing Western Uganda travel to the West on a regional tour with Judges Joanita Kawalya Muganga and Bismac Amumpaire for a series of musical and tourism challenges that will determine the 3 that will progress to the bootcamp stage.
6	6	"Central Regional Tour"	27 June 2021
5 contestants representing Central Uganda tour central with Navio and Lydia Jazmine for a series of musical and tourism challenges that will determine the 3 that will progress to the bootcamp stage.
7	7	"Unveilling the Top 12"	4 July 2021
From the four regional tours, 3 contestants progress and two are dropped from each region making up the Top 12. The 4 regional theme songs will also premiere as the show recaps on the regional tours.
8	8	"Boot Camp"	11 July 2021
The top 12 contestants check into boot camp. The tourism challenges intensify when the contestants experience Jinja City in the Eastern part of Uganda all while rehearsing for a dance and musical challenge.
9	9	"Elimination Round"	18 July 2021
The top 12 contestants are paired up to perform covers or original compositions as duets to perform before the Judges and impress their way into the Top 8. The tourism challenge finds the 12 Gorilla Trekking in Bwindi Impenetrable Forest National Park.
10	10	"Elimination Round"	25 July 2021
The top 8 contestants are challenged to perform covers of legendary Ugandan musicians before the Judges and impress their way into the final 6. Judge Bismac & a jury from the Ministry of Tourism conduct a tourism ambassador workshop followed by a Question & Answer session.
11	11	"Pre-finale Special"	1 August 2021
The final 6 contestants are unveiled in a pre-finale special episode that documents their journey & growth from the Auditions to the finale.
12	12	"Season finale"	8 August 2021
Following 2 weeks of intense rehearsals, the finalist perform before our Judges and Jury but only one will be crowned Uganda's next big star & tourism ambassador with a cash prize worth 60m Ugx.

== Contestants ==
The following were the nominated contestants from each region/provinces.

Northern Province
- Francis Moro
- Onono Eric
- Opakrwot David
- Agami Tonny
- Ucanda Pearl

Western Province

- Barungi Lowena
- Bruce Dickson
- Namuyingo Rosette
- Joan Abaasa
- Aliddeki Brian

Central Province

- Mirembe Tracy
- Wandeka Maggie
- Joel Kisakye
- Nansambu Sandra
- Yesuanjagala Carsteen

Eastern Province

- Watikha Allan
- Bikaba Eric
- Muwanguzi Patricia
- Balunywa Ibrahim
- Kasirye Uthman

== Finalists ==
The finalists were; Agami Tonny, Nansambu Sandra, Bruce Dickson, Balunywa Ibrahim, Mirembe Tracy and Yesuanjagala Carsteen. All the 5 finalists got recording deals as well as booking at TAG Studios but Sandra Nansambu got full management as the overall winner.

== Awards ==
Sandra Nansambu was crowned as the winner of the grand cash prize worth Sixty Million Ugandan Shillings, a recording contract, music video production, professional talent management, collaborations with famous artists and destination trips
