= Kakooza =

Kakooza is both a given name and a surname. Notable people with the name include:

- Kakooza Nkuliza Charles, Rwandan media personality
- Christopher Kakooza, Roman Catholic prelate
- Derrick Kakooza (born 2002), Ugandan footballer
- James Kakooza, Ugandan politician
- John Kakooza (born 1964), Ugandan boxer
- Josephine Kakooza (1955–2019), Ugandan police officer
- Michael Ross Kakooza, Ugandan musician
