= Shuwa Dilu =

Rwandan comedy television series

- Genre: Sitcom; Drama
- Created by: Misago Nelly Wilson
- Written by: Misago Nelly Wilson
- Directed by: Roger Niyoyita, Ibrahim Kwizera
- Presented by: ZACU TV
- Starring: Gratien Niyitegeka; Ramadhan Benimana; Eric Nsabimana
- Country of origin: Rwanda
- Original language: rw
- No. of seasons: 2
- No. of episodes: 32

Production
- Producer: Misago Nelly Wilson
- Production location: Rwanda
- Cinematography: Obed Nshuti
- Editor: Tumushimishe Yves
- Camera setup: Single Camera
- Running time: 26 Minutes
- Production company: Zacu Entertainment LTD

Original release
- Network: Zacu TV
- Release: 2024

Related
- The Bishop's Family

Shuwa Dilu is a Rwandan comedy television series produced by Misago Nelly Wilson under Zacu Entertainment. Zacu Entertainment has also produced Seburikoko, City Maid, Indoto, The Bishop's Family, Ishusho ya Papa, and Kaliza wa Kalisa.

== History ==
The series premiered on Zacu TV in June 2024 and consists of two seasons, with two more planned. It was directed by Roger Niyoyita and stars Niyitegeka Gratien as Superi, Ramadhan Benimana as Waxi, and Eric Nsabimana as Londoni.

The second season of Shuwa Dilu sees Superi and Waxi's house become a center of activity with various guests. Superi, the more grounded of the two, attempts to maintain order amidst romantic complications and financial schemes. The addition of Ndjoli, also known as Kanyombya, a Rwandan comedian, is expected to bring further comedic elements to the series.

== Cast ==
- Niyitegeka Gratien as Superi
- Ramadhan Benimana as Waxi
- Eric Nsabimana as Londoni

== Synopsis ==
Shuwa Dilu follows Superi, Waxi, and Londoni living in a rented house. The various rooms, including the living room, kitchen, bedrooms, and a makeshift massage room, serve as the backdrop for comedic situations. The show also features scenes in the surrounding neighborhood, introducing recurring characters such as neighboring house staff who often become involved in Londoni's schemes.

Seasons three and four of Shuwa Dilu were recently announced at a press conference. According to Misago Nelly Wilson, the sitcom aims to reflect the daily lives of Rwandan households, finding humor in domestic situations. The show's goal is to portray how everyday drama can be approached with humor, resonating with audiences who can relate to the characters and scenarios.
