= Television in Rwanda =

Television was introduced late to Rwanda, only in 1992, being one of the last countries in Africa and the world to start a service. There are two state channels, Rwanda Television and Kigali Channel 2, both owned by the Rwanda Broadcasting Agency. Private television is a far more recent development.

== History ==
After a series of assessments made between 1984 and 1991, the government launched Télévision Rwandaise in December 1992. Up until then, Rwandans received television signals coming from neighboring countries. TVR broadcast from a single transmitter in Kigali on Band III VHF, subsequently followed by relay stations across the country. The station was built with French assistance.

The first broadcast was done on 31 December 1992 and opened with a speech from president Juvénal Habyarimana. It initially ran a five-hour (6pm to 11pm) schedule limited to Saturdays and Sundays, before adding programming on Fridays, aiming to cover the entire week. On 7 April 1994, following Habyarimana's death and the genocide, TVR shut down and was considered to be an "indirect" victim, one of the first. By July, American aid arrived to assist the rebuilding of TVR's heavily-damaged facilities. TVR started broadcasting again in October that year, operating on a three-day basis before finally starting full-week broadcasts in 1996.

Rwanda was also the target of the two barter syndication companies in the early 2000s. Subscription television operator Tele 10 had a deal with TVAfrica while TVR joined the African Broadcast Network in 2002.

The Rwandan government lifted its 20-year television monopoly in 2012, when licenses for Tele 10 and Family TV were approved. Tele 10 subsequently started broadcasting on 1 March 2013. By the time TV1 opened in 2014, there were now five television channels.

Analog television signals shut down in June 2014, becoming the second country in sub-Saharan Africa to do so. Rwanda now had eight television channels, seven of which local: Family TV, TV One, TV10, CNBC Africa, Lemigo TV, Contact TV, Yego TV and Rwanda Television. The growth in the amount of television channels did not reflect the growth in content, as the amount of local productions was still relatively low, other problems included the small size of the economy and the limited penetration of television sets, which made it difficult for advertisers. The problem persisted well into 2016, local viewers complained about the lack of quality of some programs.
