= Carol Nakimera =

Ugandan musician (1974–2003)

- Born: 1974; Uganda
- Died: September 19, 2003 (aged 28–29) Uganda
- Genres: Afrobeat, jazz, soul, traditional Ugandan music
- Occupations: Singer, dancer
- Years active: 1984–2003

Carol Nakimera (1974 – 19 September 2003) was a Ugandan musician and a vocalist, who rose to fame throughout the 1980s and 1990s in Uganda. Recognized for her talent in various genres and vocal ranges, she collaborated with groups like Pride Band, Afrigo Band, and Super Rockets Jazz Band. Her hit songs include "Omusujja" and "Genda y’Olabe." She exuded a powerful presence in both recordings and live performances. Nakimera was well known for her ability to sing even without rehearsals.

Nakimera was also a feminist activist who advocated for women's rights through her songs and concerts.

== Background and career ==
Carol Nakimera was a celebrated Ugandan singer, widely regarded as one of the most talented and versatile vocalists of her generation. Born in Uganda, she rose to prominence in the local music scene during a vibrant era for Ugandan bands. Nakimera's career took off as she performed with several notable groups, including the Pride Band, Afrigo Band, and Super Rockets Jazz Band, showcasing her ability to adapt across musical genres and captivate audiences with her powerful voice.

Her vocal range and stage presence earned her high praise from peers. Musicians like Frank Mbalire described her as a "monster in the studio," highlighting her natural talent and ability to deliver flawless performances, even without extensive preparation. Some of her well-known songs include "Omusujja" and "Genda y’Olabe," which remain memorable in Uganda's music history. Despite her undeniable talent, Nakimera was also known for a free-spirited personality—she often skipped rehearsals, relying on her raw ability to shine during live shows.

In 1995, Nakimera began her feminist activist activities where she headed an organisation named Abakyaala si Mmele where she would organise concerts for women empowerment along with other female artists like Sarah Birungi and Joanitah Kawalya.

== Personal life ==
Carol Nakimera was born in Uganda in 1974, She grew up and studied from Kenya where she used to sing in her school's mass choir in her childhood. Nakimera pursued her career as a musician and a dancer in super rockets band 1983 and later in 2003 succumbed to liver cancer in September 2003. She was buried at her mother's home in Luweero kisaasi.

== Songs ==
- Omusujja
- Abakulu
- Holiday
- Gendayo
- Wabaaki
- Sembera
- Bye bye star
- Kwiti kwiti

== Collaborations ==
=== Bands ===
- The Jambo stars1987
- One woman army
- Super Rockets Band
- Vibrations band
- Central volcano
- Twins band
- California band
- Afrigo band
- Cross Roads Band

=== Artists songs ===
- Oli musajjaki ft Umaru Katumba
- Omukwano guluma,
- Omukwaano ogwe'wala

=== Other associated artists ===
- Sarah Birungi
- Fred Maiso
- Midi Mbaziira
- Joanitah Kawalya
- Harry Lwanga

== Legacy and influence ==
Nakimera is remembered as one of the talented and most influence female vocalists in Uganda's band music of her time. Her wonderful voice, versatility and her presence and confidence on stage contributed to molding the sound and performance style of live band music in Uganda during late 20th century. She is more often referred to by the musicians and music historians or legends as an example of a naturally gifted performer whose impact extended above Commercial benefits. Carol's career challenged the idea of gender norms within Uganda's principally male band music industry. In both her performances and feminist activism, she assisted in creating greater transparency for women in professional music spaces. Her leadership of Abakyaala Si Mmele and collaboration with other female musicians is considered as an early efforts to link known music with women empowerment in Uganda. Very many contemporary Ugandan female musicians and vocalists have referred to Nakimera as an inspiration, especially for her independence as a performer and vocal confidence. Her songs continued to get airplay on Ugandan radio stations most especially''Omusujja'' and are used as references in discussion of classic band music in Uganda.

== See also ==
- Music of Uganda
- Afrigo Band
- Joanita Kawalya
- Umaru Katumba
