= Herman Ssewanyana =

Ugandan musician

- Born: 1955 (age 70–71); Uganda
- Citizenship: Uganda
- Occupations: Musician & Percussionist
- Years active: 1974–present
- Known for: Music
- Title: Percussionist; Percussion Discussion Africa & Afrigo Band

Herman Ssewanyana aka "Ow'enseenene Ssewanyana" (born 1955) is a Ugandan musician and percussionist. He is the current Band Leader, Musical Director and Percussionist with the musical group Percussion Discussion Africa. He is a member and percussionist with the musical band Afrigo Band, the longest-lasting musical band in Uganda, which was founded in 1975.

== Background and education ==
He was born on in Buganda circa 1955.

== Music career ==
Ssewanyana was a member of the Afrigo Band, since circa 1980. In 1997, while still with Afrigo, he founded Percussion Discussion Africa, focusing on cultural music, with emphasis on African percussion instruments. Since 2011, he has collaborated with other Ugandan music artists to produce the annual music festival known as Zivuge. In 2012, he was part of The Percussion Gurus, Qwela Junction, a two-hour performance by leading Ugandan percussionists, held at Emin Pasha Hotel in Kampala on 30 March 2012.

== See also ==
- Afrigo Band
- Moses Matovu
- Joanita Kawalya
