= Mutiganda Wa Nkunda =

Rwandan filmmaker

Mutiganda wa Nkunda
- Born: 18 October 1989 (age 36); Kigali, Rwanda
- Occupations: Director, producer, writer
- Years active: 2013–present

Mutiganda wa Nkunda (born 18 October 1989), is a Rwandan director, screenwriter and producer.

== Personal life ==
He was born on 18 October 1989 in Kigali, Rwanda.

== Career ==
In 2012, while still a student, four of wa Nkunda's screenplays were shortlisted in the Global Dialogues Short Story Creating Contest. In 2013 he completed a bachelor's degree in Agriculture and started to work as a film critic and journalist with several Rwandan media. In 2014, he wrote, produced and directed his first short film Rayila. The story which is available to view on YouTube, follows the plight of a teenage mother and her six-month old baby. According to the film's prologue text, the sixteen year-old was raped, impregnated and infected with HIV/AIDS by her stepfather. The film gained critical acclaim and won awards in several local and international film festivals.

Also in 2014, he wrote the popular sitcom Inshuti which aired on TV 10 Rwanda between 2014 and 2015. It is considered the first ever TV series to be produced in Rwanda. It was also released on YouTube where it gained a fanbase.

In 2015, wa Nkunda worked as a producer on the short film Ishaba at the filmmaking workshop conducted at the inaugural Mashariki African Film Festival (MAAFF). The short film was screened at international film festivals and released on DVD by Africalia as part of its African Best Short Films collection. Later in the year, he attended the Maisha Film Lab screenwriting workshop in Kigali, where he developed the popular comedy series Seburikoko which first aired on Rwanda Television in March 2015.

In 2015 he also directed an experimental short film, La Femme Nue which was selected to screen at the 3rd edition of MAAFF.

After leaving his journalism career in 2016, he focused completely on filmmaking. In 2016 he directed the TV series City Maid for Rwanda Television and scripted the series Virunga School for Royal TV. He wrote, produced, and directed his second short film, Ibanga ry’umunezero, in 2017.

In 2017 he co-founded the independent film production company IZACU with Yuhi Amuli.

Under the banner of IZACU, he self-funded his first feature film, Nameless, which he later pitched at the Takmil workshop at the 2018 Carthage Film Festival where it was acquired by the French giant Orange Studio. The film premiered at the 2021 Fribourg Film Festival in Switzerland and was selected to compete in the main competition at FESPACO 2021 where it won the prize for Best Screenplay.

In 2020 he produced A Taste of our Land directed by Yuhi Amuli, which won Best First Feature Narrative at the PanAfrican Film Festival in 2020 and Best First Feature Film by a Director at the Africa Movie Academy Awards that same year. The film also provided Michael Wawuyo a Best Actor Award at the Festival du Cinéma Africain de Khouribga.

== Filmography ==
Year	Film	Role	Genre	Ref.
2013	Rayila	Director, writer, producer	Short film	
2014	Inshuti (Friends)	Director	TV sitcom	
2015	Ishaba	Producer	Short film	
2015	Seburikoko	Writer	TV series	
2015	La Femme Nue (The Naked Woman)	Director	Short film	
2016	City Maid	Director	TV series	
2016	Virunga School	Writer	TV series	
2017	Ibanga ry’umunezero (The Secret of Happiness)	Director, writer, producer	Short film	
2021	Nameless	Director	Feature film (debut)	
2020	Rocabye (Ibihozo)	Director	Short film	
2019	Pearl Lost in an Empty House	Producer	Feature film	
2020	A Taste of our Land	Producer	Feature film	
