= Nameless (2021 film) =

- French: Les Anonymes
- Directed by: Mutiganda Wa Nkunda
- Written by: Mutiganda Wa Nkunda
- Produced by: Yuhi Amuli; Nadim Cheikhrouha
- Starring: Colombe Mukeshimana; Yves Kijyana
- Cinematography: Bora Shingiro
- Edited by: Lydvine Hakizimana; David Pujol
- Production companies: IZACU-AM; Tanit Films; Orange Studio
- Distributed by: Orange Studio
- Release date: July 2021 (Fribourg)
- Running time: 85 minutes
- Country: Rwanda
- Language: Kinyarwanda

Nameless (French title: Les Anonymes) is a 2021 Rwandan drama film directed by Mutiganda Wa Nkunda in his directorial debut. The film was screened at the 27th edition of the FESPACO, where it won a prize for Best Scenario. It was inspired by a senseless crime Nkunda witnessed in Kigali, and by Ken Loach's 1966 film Cathy Come Home.

== Synopsis ==
The film was based on real events of the difficult life of a pair young lovers from Kigali, and their tragic descent into violence.

== Cast ==
- Colombe Mukeshimana as Kathy
- Yves Kijyana as Philibert
