= International Federation of the Phonographic Industry =

Organisation that represents the interests of the recording industry

- Abbreviation: IFPI
- Formation: 1933; 93 years ago
- Headquarters: IFPI The Shard, 7th floor, 32 London Bridge Street, London, SE1
- Chief executive: Victoria Oakley
- Main organ: Main board of directors
- Subsidiaries: See below
- Website: www.ifpi.org

The International Federation of the Phonographic Industry (IFPI) is the organisation that represents the interests of the recording industry worldwide. It is a non-profit members' organisation registered in Switzerland. It operates a secretariat based in London, with regional offices in Brussels, Hong Kong, Miami, Abu Dhabi, Singapore and Nairobi.

== Function ==
IFPI's mission is to promote the value of recorded music, campaign for record producer rights, and expand the commercial uses of recorded music. Its services to members include a legal policy programme, litigation, content protection, sales reporting for the recorded music market, insight and analysis and work in the areas of performance rights, technology and trade.

== Structure ==
IFPI is governed by its Main Board, a group including representatives from across the organisation's members (including major and independent record labels), representatives from certain IFPI National Groups and the organisation's CEO. There are also two regional boards (the IFPI Asia/Pacific Regional Board and IFPI Latin America Regional Board) which oversee regional matters.

In April 2024 IFPI announced that Victoria Oakley had been appointed as CEO, joining the organisation in June 2024. The previous CEO, Frances Moore, stepped down in December 2023. She had been appointed the chief executive with a term effective from 1 July 2010. She had replaced John Kennedy, who had headed the organisation since 2005 and was also one of the co-producers of Live Aid and Live8. Moore was awarded an MBE in the Queen's Birthday Honours List in 2021 for her services to the music industry.

== Scope of influence ==
IFPI represents the recording industry worldwide; there are some 8,000 members across IFPI and its global network, operating in over 70 markets and some 70 local industry associations, affiliated music licensing companies and IFPI offices. According to its criteria, IFPI membership is open to "a legal entity or person which is either a producer of phonograms or music videos, copies of which are made available to the public in reasonable quantities", though the organisation does not define "reasonable quantities".

National groups and affiliate bodies include SNEP in France; BVMI in Germany; RIAJ in Japan; BPI in the UK; RIAA in the US; ARIA in Australia; Music Canada; AMPROFON in Mexico; Recorded Music New Zealand; Promusicae in Spain; FIMI in Italy and others. Record labels can be members of both their local industry body and IFPI.

== History ==
Members of the international phonographic industry formed IFPI at the industry's first international congress in Rome, Italy, held from 10 to 14 November 1933. IFPI described its mission as representing "the interests of the recording industry worldwide in all fora" by promoting legislation and copyrights and "to protect the largely British-based recording industry" by promoting a global performance right in gramophone sound recordings.

=== Phonogram copyrights established ===
The IFPI lobbied at the Rome Convention for the Protection of Performers, Producers of Phonograms and Broadcasting Organisations of 1961, which established an international standard for the protection of sound recordings, live performances and broadcasts. This convention was opposed by trade groups representing authors and composers, who were concerned that establishing such "neighbouring rights" would undermine their own control over how their works were used and would result in prohibitively expensive licensing. Pressure from United States–based broadcasters who did not want to license the records they broadcast, among other factors, kept the United States from signing the convention; the United States would not recognise a separate sound recording copyright until 1971.

=== Phonogram copy protection efforts ===
In an effort to combat copyright violation, in 1971, the IFPI advocated for the Convention for the Protection of Producers of Phonograms Against Unauthorized Duplication of Their Phonograms (the Geneva Phonograms Convention), which 72 countries signed.

In 1986, the ISO established the International Standard Recording Code (ISRC) standard, ISO 3901. In 1989, the IFPI was designated the registration authority for ISRC codes. ISRC codes "enable the use of copyright protected recordings and works to be controlled; facilitate the distribution and collection of royalties (performances, private copying); and assist in the fight against piracy".

To further combat infringement of recorded works, the IFPI and the compact disc manufacturing industry introduced Source Identification (SID) codes in 1994. The SID codes are markings on optical discs such as compact discs (CD) and digital versatile discs (DVD) that identify the manufacturer, equipment, and master discs used to create each disc. There are two codes: the SID mastering code and the SID mould code. The SID mastering code identifies the manufacturing facility used to produce a master from which moulds are produced. The SID mould code identifies the plant where the disc was moulded (replicated). Since not all optical disc manufacturing facilities have the ability to both produce master discs and replicate discs, the SID mastering code and SID mould code on a given optical disc may or may not represent the same manufacturing facility.

SID codes follow a standard format consisting of the letters "IFPI" followed by four or five hexadecimal digits. A number prefaced with "L" is a "mastering code", a serial number taken from a pool assigned by Philips to the manufacturer. The mastering code identifies the Laser Beam Recorder (LBR) signal processor or mould that produced a particular stamper or a glass master disc from which moulds are produced. Non-"L" numbers are "mould codes", which identify the manufacturer that replicated the disc. Phillips assigns the first 2 or 3 digits of the mould code and the remaining digits are a serial number assigned by that plant to its moulds.

=== Pirate Bay incidents ===
In mid-October 2007, after IFPI let the ifpi.com domain registration lapse, ownership of the ifpi.com domain was transferred to The Pirate Bay, a group which claimed it received the domain from an anonymous donor. The group set up a Website under the domain titled "International Federation of Pirates Interests", a replacement backronym for IFPI. Ownership of the domain was returned to IFPI in late November, when a WIPO arbitration panel concluded that "the Disputed Domain Name is identical or confusingly similar to a trademark in which the [IFPI] has rights" and that the Pirate Bay's representative "registered and [was] using the Disputed Domain Name in bad faith" and failed to adequately rebut IFPI's contention that he "has no rights or a legitimate interest in the Disputed Domain Name". The organisation's website www.ifpi.org was unaffected during the dispute.

=== Milestones ===
- 1996 – Platinum Europe Awards established
- 2003 – Pro-Music established, a website with a directory of licensed music services in each country, supported by a cross-sector industry groups and set up and run by IFPI
- 2004 – IFPI's Global Music Report first published (an annual publication; first edition called Online Music Report and subsequently renamed Digital Music Report in 2005. Rebranded to current name in 2016 and combined with separate publication Recording Industry in Numbers as combined report Global Music Report)
- 2005 – IFPI instrumental in litigation against illegal file-sharing site Kazaa, which later became a licensed service
- 2009 – coordinated music industry action against The Pirate Bay, resulting in a high-profile ruling against the site's operators
- 2013 – IFPI's Global Recording Artist of the Year Award is established; a list of the world's top 10 most popular artists across a calendar year. The artist in the number one spot is presented with a physical award by IFPI.
- 2015 – Launch of New Music Fridays, the global switch to all markets releasing music on a Friday, driven by a steering committee including IFPI
- 2015 – IFPI led legal action against Russian site vKontakte which led to a Russian court ordering the service to stop its "large-scale infringement" and later saw the site become licensed in 2016
- 2017 – IFPI co-ordinated legal action leading to the closure of the world's largest stream-ripping site, YouTubeMP3
- 2019 – Changes to the European Copyright Directive—designed to create a fairer licensing environment for recorded music online—are adopted by the European Parliament, following a campaign by the creative industries, including IFPI
- 2020 – A Sub-Saharan Africa IFPI regional office was opened in Nairobi, working across the region's 46 markets.
- 2021 – IFPI opens first office in the MENA region in Abu Dhabi.
- 2022 – A new Southeast Asia regional office opened in Singapore.
- 2023 - IFPI launches four new Charts in the MENA region (Egypt, Saudi Arabia, UAE and North Africa)
- 2024 - The European Parliament adopts the landmark EU Artificial Intelligence Act, following a campaign by groups including IFPI
- 2025 - IFPI Launches Official Southeast Asia Charts Hub with Creation of New Charts in Philippines and Vietnam (Indonesia, Malaysia, Singapore, Thailand; additional charts: Philippines and Vietnam)

== Certifications and awards ==
IFPI publishes six annual top-ten charts: Global Recording Artist Chart, Global Single Chart, Global Album Chart, Global Album Sales Chart, Global Vinyl Album Chart, and Global Streaming Album Chart. Each chart's leading entry is recognized with an award presented by the organization. The Global Vinyl Album Chart was first introduced in March 2022, followed by the Global Streaming Album Chart in March 2023.

Launched in January 2014, the Global Recording Artist Chart was the first global chart to accurately capture the popularity of artists across streaming channels, alongside digital and physical album and singles sales. The independently verified chart includes sales across the calendar year and captures all the music of each artist featured, not just one song or album. It uses album-equivalent units to combine measurements of downloads, physical sales, and streams. The chart's number-one artist is presented with a physical award, as the Global Recording Artist of the Year. The winners have been: One Direction in 2013, Taylor Swift in 2014, Adele in 2015, Drake in 2016, Ed Sheeran in 2017, Drake in 2018, Taylor Swift in 2019, BTS in 2020 and 2021, and Taylor Swift in 2022, 2023, 2024, and 2025.

IFPI also publishes a list of the top 10 best-performing global singles and albums each year. The most recent winners (2025) were Rosé and Bruno Mars's "APT." and Taylor Swift's The Life of a Showgirl, respectively. The Life of a Showgirl was also the most recent Global Album Sales and Global Vinyl Album winner, while Morgan Wallen's I'm the Problem was the top Global Streaming Album.

Formerly, IFPI ran certifications called the IFPI Platinum Europe Awards and the IFPI Middle East Awards. The IFPI Platinum Europe Awards were founded in 1996. They are awarded for actual retail sales (as opposed to shipments) of one million albums, in one of the following countries: Austria, Belgium, Bulgaria, Czech Republic, Denmark, Finland, France, Germany, Greece, Hungary, Iceland, Ireland, Italy, Luxembourg, Netherlands, Norway, Poland, Portugal, Russia, Serbia, Slovakia, Spain, Sweden, Switzerland, Turkey and United Kingdom. The IFPI Middle East Awards were established in October 2009. They were awarded for sales in either Lebanon or the Gulf Cooperation Council countries, namely Bahrain, Kuwait, Oman, Qatar, Saudi Arabia and the United Arab Emirates. In the Gulf Cooperation Council, gold certification was awarded for sales of 3,000 units and platinum for sales of 6,000 units. In Lebanon, gold certification was awarded for sales of 1,000 units and platinum for sales of 2,000 units.

== Local associations ==
IFPI has a number of local associations and national groups:

- Argentina: Argentine Chamber of Phonograms and Videograms Producers (CAPIF)
- Australia: Australian Recording Industry Association (ARIA)
- Austria: IFPI Austria
- Barbados: Copyright Society of Composers, Authors and Publishers Incorporated (COSCAP)
- Belgium: Belgian Recorded Music Association (BRMA)
- Brazil: Pro-Música Brasil (PMB)
- Bosnia and Herzegovina: Udruženje za zaštitu prava proizvođača fonograma (Fonogram)
- Bulgaria: Bulgarian Association of Music Producers (BAMP)
- Bulgaria: PROPHON
- Canada: Music Canada
- Chile: Sociedad de Productores Fonográficos y Videográficos de Chile (PROFOVI)
- Colombia: Promúsica Colombia
- Croatia: Croatian Phonographic Association (HDU)
- Costa Rica: Asociación Costarricense de la Industria Fonográfica y Afines (FONOTICA)
- Czech Republic and Slovakia: Česká národní skupina Mezinárodní federace hudebního průmyslu (ČNS IFPI)
- Denmark: IFPI Danmark
- Dominican Republic: Sociedad Dominicana de Productores Fonográficos (SodinPro)
- Ecuador: Sociedad de Productores de Fonogramas (SOPROFON)
- El Salvador: Asociación Salvadoreña de Productores de Fonogramas y Afines (ASAP EGC)
- Estonia: Eesti Fonogrammitootjate Ühing (EFÜ)
- Finland: Musiikkituottajat (IFPI Finland)
- France: Syndicat national de l'édition phonographique (SNEP)
- Germany: Bundesverband Musikindustrie (BVMI)
- Greece: IFPI Greece
- Guatemala: Asociación Guatemalteca de la Industria de Productores de Fonogramas y Afines (AGINPRO)
- Honduras: Asociación Fonográfica de Honduras (ANFHORA)
- Hong Kong: Hong Kong Recording Industry Alliance (HKRIA)
- Hong Kong: IFPI Hong Kong Group
- Hungary: Magyar Hanglemezkiadók Szövetsége (MAHASZ)
- Iceland: Félag hljómplötuframleiðenda
- India: Indian Music Industry (IMI)
- Indonesia: Asosiasi Industri Rekaman Indonesia (ASIRI)
- Ireland: Irish Recorded Music Association (IRMA)
- Israel: IFPI Israel
- Italy: Federazione Industria Musicale Italiana (FIMI)
- Jamaica: Jamaica Music Society (JAMMS)
- Japan: Recording Industry Association of Japan (RIAJ)
- Luxembourg: Syndicat des auteurs, compositeurs et éditeurs de musique (SACEM)
- Kenya: Recording Industry of Kenya (RIKE)
- Latvia: Latvian Music Producers Association (LaIPA)
- Lithuania: Lithuanian Neighbouring Rights Association (AGATA)
- Malaysia: Recording Industry Association of Malaysia (RIM)
- Mexico: Asociación Mexicana de Productores de Fonogramas y Videogramas (AMPROFON)
- Netherlands: Nederlandse Vereniging van Producenten en Importeurs van beeld- en geluidsdragers (NVPI)
- New Zealand: Recorded Music NZ
- Nigeria: Record Label Proprietors' Initiative (ReLPI)
- North Macedonia: Makedonska Muzička Industrija (MMI)
- Norway: IFPI Norge
- Panama: Sociedad Panameña de Productores Fonográficos (PRODUCE)
- Paraguay: Sociedad de Gestion de Productores Fonograficos del Paraguay (SGP)
- Peru: Unión Peruana de Productores Fonográficos (UNIMPRO)
- Philippines: Philippine Association of the Record Industry (PARI)
- Poland: Związek Producentów Audio-Video (ZPAV)
- Portugal: Associação Fonográfica Portuguesa (AFP)
- Romania: Uniunea Producătorilor de Fonograme din România (UPFR)
- Serbia: Organizacija proizvođača fonograma Srbije (OFPS)
- Singapore: Recording Industry Association Singapore (RIAS)
- South Africa: Recording Industry of South Africa (RISA)
- South Korea: Korea Music Content Association (KMCA)
- Spain: Productores de Música de España (Promusicae)
- Sweden: IFPI Sverige
- Switzerland: IFPI Schweiz
- Taiwan: Recording Industry Foundation in Taiwan (RIT)
- Thailand: Thai Entertainment Content Trade Association (TECA)
- Trinidad and Tobago: Copyright Music Organisation of Trinidad and Tobago (COTT)
- Turkey: Mü-Yap
- Uganda: Uganda Performing Right Society (UPRS)
- Ukraine: Asotsiatsiya Muzychnoyi Industriyi Ukrayiny (UAMI)
- United Kingdom: British Phonographic Industry (BPI)
- United States: Recording Industry Association of America (RIAA)
- Uruguay: Cámara Uruguaya de Productores de Fonogramas y Videogramas (CUD)
- Venezuela: Asociación Venezolana de Intérpretes y Productores de Fonogramas (AVINPRO)

== See also ==
- List of music recording certifications
- List of largest recorded music markets
- Peer-to-peer file sharing
