= Joanita Kawalya =

Uganda musician

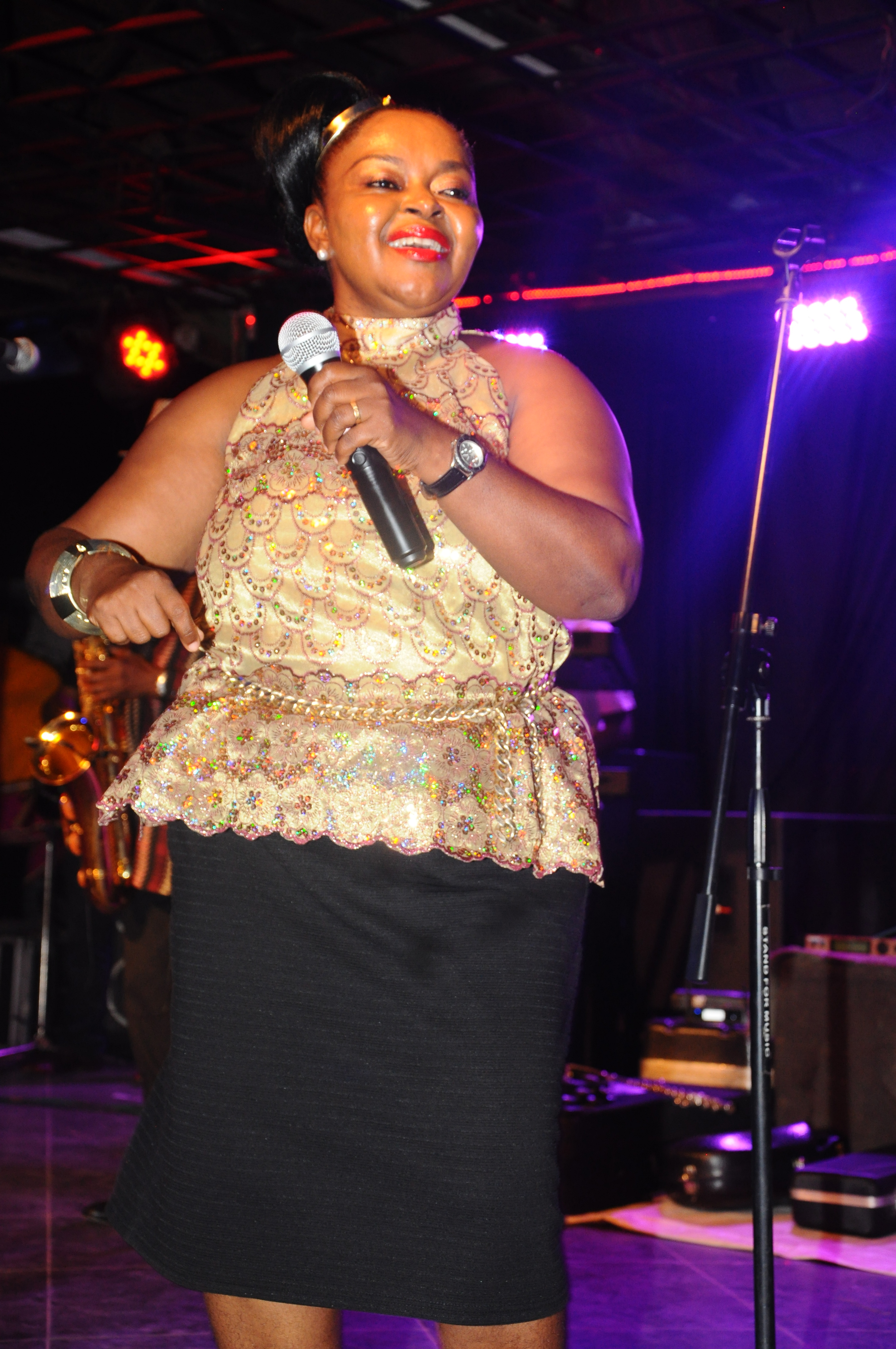
- Born: 1 May 1967 (age 59); Uganda
- Education: Lubiri Secondary School
- Alma mater: Kyambogo University
- Occupation: Musician
- Spouse: Christopher Muganga

Joanita Kawalya is a Ugandan musician and activist. She is a member of the Afrigo Band, the longest-lasting musical band in Uganda, which has been in continuous existence since 1975.

== Early life and education ==
Kawalya was born to the late singer Eclaus Kawalya on 5 January 1967. She worked as a teacher at Lubiri Senior Secondary School between 1989 and 1993.

== Music career ==
Kawalya started singing at an early age. She went on to sing in choir in school and later as a part time member of "The Wrens", courtesy of her father's guest performances with the band. He would take the whole family with him. She joined Afrigo Band in 1986 when she was nineteen-year-old, replacing her sister, Margaret, also a vocalist who was leaving for Germany. She did music as she did a teaching course at Kyambogo University. In 1993, she quit teaching and concentrated on music and mothering her two children.

== Other responsibilities ==
She has served as a community advisory member on the National Aids project, the Walter Reed project and the Makerere Johns Hopkins joint project. She has also been involved in grass root campaigns for HIV/AIDS and her face is now recognizable as one of the facilitators for the Nabagereka's annual cultural fete, the Kisakaate. Kawalya is also involved in mentorship of talent.

In 2020, Kawalya participated in the gender identity week organized by Makerere University School of Women and Gender Studies

== Family ==
Joanita Kawalya is married to Christo Muganga, and is a mother of two children.

== See also ==
- Afrigo Band
- Moses Matovu
- Frank Mbalire
- Carol Nakimera
