= 1TV =

1TV may refer to:

- 1TV (Afghan TV channel)
- 1TV (Macedonian TV channel)
- 1TV (Armenia), or Public Television Company of Armenia (www.1tv.am)
- Channel One Russia (www.1tv.ru)
- First Channel (Georgian TV channel) (www.1tv.ge)

== See also ==
- Channel 1 (disambiguation)
- TV1 (disambiguation)
