= Irakoze Ariane Vanessa =

Rwandan actress (born 2000)

- Born: Irakoze Ariane Vanessa; 20 September 2000 (age 25); Kigali, Rwanda
- Occupation: Actress
- Years active: 2020–present
- Television: Maya, The Secret, City Maid, Ishusho ya Papa, Bridge of Christmas,Hurts harder
- Awards: Mashariki African Film Festival

Irakoze Ariane Vanessa is a Rwandan film actress who started her acting career in 2020, in the web series Maya. Shortly afterwards, Irakoze acted in another web series, The Secret, which was produced by Rwandan filmmaker Yves Mizero.

Irakoze starred in the television series Ishusho ya Papa as Olive.

== Awards ==
- Best Iziwacu Actress, Mashariki African Film Festival 2024.
