= Samskruthi =

Samskruthi was a spiritual channel in Telugu from the Associated Broadcasting Company Private Limited, which was popularly with the TV9 channels. It was launched on the eve of Diwali in 2007.

Samskruthi Channel was the first 24 hours Telugu bhakthi channel. Samskruthi Channel was the first Telugu cultural channel to broadcast religious (all religions), spiritual and cultural programs to the audience across the world. The coverage area included the entire Indian sub continent, South East Asia, and a part of Middle East. Samskruthi is now defunct. This channel is now called TV 1.
