= KNC =

KNC may refer to:

- Kamerun National Congress
- Kakooza Nkuliza Charles
- Kiribati National Championship, top division association football league in Kiribati
- Kiss and cry, often abbreviated as KnC
- Kurdish National Council
- Intel Xeon Phi Knights Corner
