= Rachael Magoola =

Ugandan politician

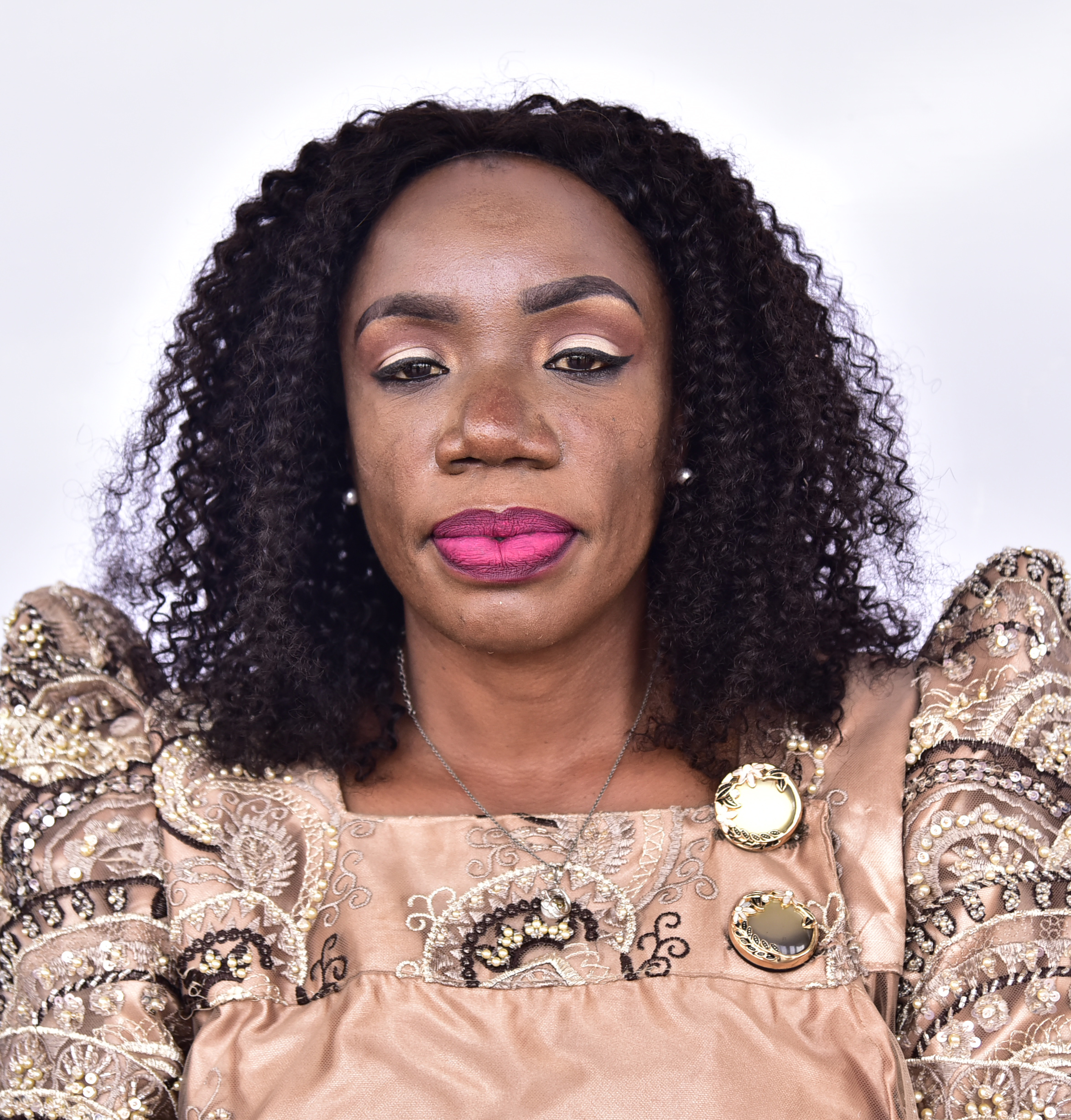
- Born: 1966 (age 59–60); Uganda
- Citizenship: Uganda
- Education: Tororo Girls School; Namasagali College; Kaliro Teacher Training College; Kyambogo University
- Occupations: Musician, and politician
- Employer(s): Namasagali College; Kyambogo University; Afrigo Band
- Political party: National Resistance Movement
- Father: Nicholas Magoola

Rachael Magoola is a Ugandan singer, songwriter, dancer, and politician. She is one of the members of Afrigo Band. In the 2021 general election she was elected to Parliament, as the women's representative in Bugweri District, for the National Resistance Movement.

== Early life and education ==
Magoola’s musical journey started at home where her father, the late Nicholas Magoola, was a music teacher at several colleges in eastern Uganda. As a young girl she sang in the church choir and played musical instruments at home. In Senior Two she was expelled from Tororo Girls School for performing in a band while on a school break. In 1983 Magoola joined Namasagali College and later "Kaliro Teacher Training College" where she trained as a secondary school teacher, specialising in music and languages. She taught at Namasagali College until 1993 when she left for Kyambogo University where she studied a degree course in education, majoring in Music. Although she was the best student in her class Magoola didn’t graduate because she was discontinued from her course for absconding when she went on tour with Afrigo Band. She recorded "Obangaina" in London with Afrigo Band and the song became an instant hit. Magoola went back to Kyambogo University in 2012 to complete and receive her education degree.

== Music ==
Magoola joined Afrigo where she arranged a lot of the music and choreography. In 2001 Rachel formed and launched her own group which recorded three albums: Inhaife, Tyenda Wundi and Tonyiiga. In 2003, she left Afrigo band and Uganda, for the United Kingdom. At London's South Bank she led the 'Women of Kampala' group in London's African Music Festival and collaborated with South African trumpeter Claude Deppa. In 2009 Rachel and her band performed at the Sauti za Busara festival in Zanzibar. Her compositions contain elements of languages and traditional rhythms from all regions of Uganda, as well as reggae and zouk. Magoola has a total of six albums: Inhaife (1997), Tyenda Wundi (1998), Tonyiiga (2000), Atubembe (2001), Songs from the Source of the Nile (2005) and Eisadha (2008).

== Discography ==
- Inhaife (1997)
- Tyenda Wundi (1998)
- Tonyiiga (2000)
- Atubembe (2001)
- Songs from the Source of the Nile (2005)
- Eisadha (2008)
