= Kaliza Wa Kalisa =

Rwandan Drama television series

- Genre: Comedy; Drama; Adaptation
- Created by: Misago Nelly Wilson
- Written by: DUSHIMIMANA Prudence
- Directed by: Niyoyita Roger
- Presented by: ZACU TV
- Starring: Gatesi Kayonga Divine; Irunga Longin; Uwamahoro Antoinette; Bahati Xavier; Nshimirimana Yannick; Dusenge Clenia; Iradukunda Aboubakar; Rwamba Cedrick; Semana Djumapili; Muhoozi Jean Paul; Umuhire Alain Gilbert
- Country of origin: Rwanda
- Original language: Kinyarwanda
- No. of seasons: 2
- No. of episodes: 26

Production
- Producer: Misago Nelly Wilson
- Production location: Rwanda
- Cinematography: Louis UDAHEMUKA
- Editor: Paul Hakizimana
- Camera setup: Double Camera
- Running time: 20-30 Minutes
- Production company: Zacu Entertainment LTD

Original release
- Network: Zee TV
- Release: August 27, 2024

Related
- Kareena Kareena

Kaliza wa Kalisa is an adaptation drama TV series originated from India as Kareena Kareena, produced by Zee Entertainment. Kaliza wa Kalisa was created by Misago Nelly Wilson through adaptation, produced through Zacu Entertainment Ltd. The series began airing on ZACU TV on August 27, 2024 The series consists of 2 seasons and continuing producing, directed by Niyoyita Roger.

== Cast ==
- Gatesi Kayonga Divine as Kaliza
- Irunga Longin as Rudahunga
- Uwamahoro Antoinette as Kayirebwa
- Bahati Xavier as Mugabo
- Nshimirimana Yannick as Rwema
- Dusenge Clenia as Nicole
- Iradukunda Aboubakar as Mwungeri
- Rwamba Cedrick as Munyentwari
- Semana Djumapili as Ngoboka
- Muhoozi Jean Paul as Butera
- Umuhire Alain Gilbert as Mugenzi

== Recognition ==
At the tenth edition of Mashariki African Film Festival, the TV Series received the first award for Iziwacu Best TV Series in 2024.

== Synopsis ==
Kaliza wa Kalisa recounts the story of a Kaliza, a young and funny woman, who moves from Rusizi to Kigali to chase her dreams. Running out of time to find a job, she uses her charm to navigate city life. She lands an interview at Umusambi Cosmetics, but the job requires her to be married. Desperately, she lied to get hired. Just as she thinks her secret is safe, she covers for a friend at Switi Radio and becomes famous. How long can Kaliza keep up the lies and balance her double life?
