= Boki 13 =

Macedonian television personality and businessman

- Боки 13
- Born: Bojan Jovanovski; 19 August 1986 (age 39); Skopje, SR Macedonia, SFR Yugoslavia
- Other names: Boki 13
- Occupations: TV personality; entrepreneur
- Years active: 2010–Present

Bojan Jovanovski (Macedonian: Бојан Јовановски; born 19 August 1986), better known as Boki 13 (Macedonian: Боки 13), is a Macedonian television personality, political activist and entrepreneur. Initially recognised for his androgynous appearance, Jovanovski rose to fame in 2010 as a contestant on the fourth Serbian season of Celebrity Big Brother, finishing in third place. His debut album, titled Ne plaši se ogledala (Don't Be Afraid of the Mirrors) and sung primarily in Serbian, was released in 2012 under Belgrade-based City Records. It included a stand-out track "Kaligula" (Caligula), gifted to him by Jelena Karleuša.

In 2017, Jovanovski became the president of the International Union for Civil Society and Socially Vulnerable in North Macedonia. In March 2018, he launched a national television network 1TV, which was shut down in September the following year. In June 2020, he was found guilty on counts of "illegal influence" and "money laundering" as a part of the crime investigation "Racket".

== Legal issues ==
According to Macedonian portal Netpress, Jovanovski was fined with €15,000 for smuggling designer clothes through Skopje International Airport in March 2018.

On 15 July 2019, Bojan Jovanovski was arrested by the warrant from the Prosecution for organized crime under suspicion of racketeering. This event occurred following the release of a video and an audio recording from an unnamed source by the Italian magazine La Verita, which shows Jovanovski getting paid €1,5 million by Macedonian businessman Jordan Kamchev, who had been accused of organized crime, so that Jovanovski influences the prosecutor Katica Janeva, whom he claims to have close ties with, to judge in the favor of Kamchev. Jovanovski also mentioned that he had contacted the Prime Minister of North Macedonia, Zoran Zaev, about the case. Zaev firmly denied these speculations branding them as ungrounded and reminded that he was the one who reported the case against Kamchev. On 18 June 2020, Jovanovski was sentenced to nine years of incarceration for illegal influence and money laundering.

In April 2022, Jovanovski was also found guilty on the count of deceiving two Macedonian businessmen for close to a million euros through his non-governmental organization "Međunarodni savez".

While serving his time in Idrizovo correctional facility, it was reported that he was physically assaulted by three inmates in October 2022.

== Filmography ==
Filmography of Boki 13
| Year | Title | Genre | Role | Notes |
|---|---|---|---|---|
| 2010 | Veliki Brat | Television | Himself | VIP Season 4; 3rd place |
| 2010 | Farma | Television | Himself | Season 3; Walked |
| 2011 | Dvor | Television | Himself | Guest |
| 2011 | Arena B13 | Television | Himself | Presenter |

== Discography ==
- Ne plaši se ogledala (2012)
