= Jordan Kamchev =

Macedonian businessman (born 1970)

- Јордан Камчев
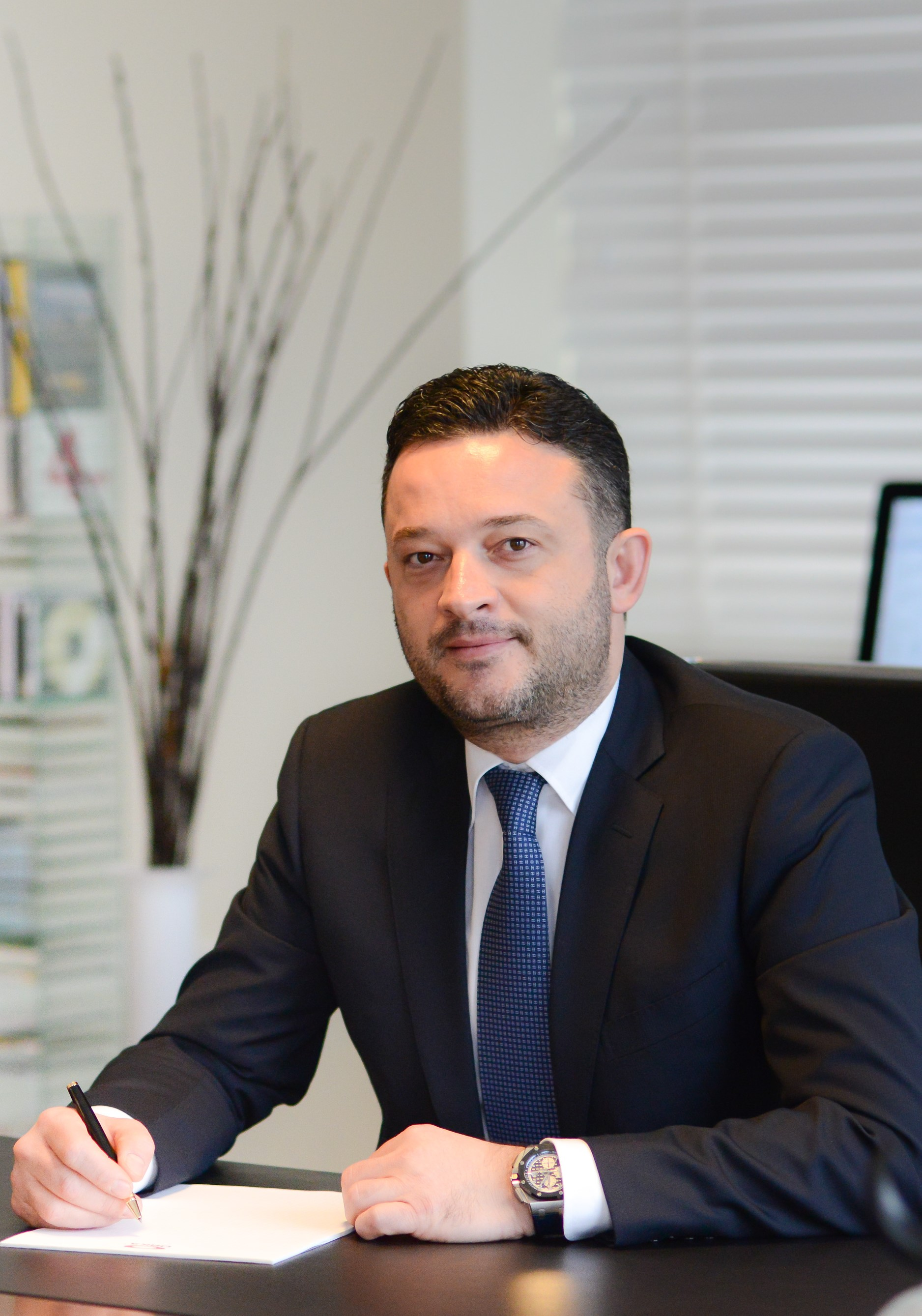
- Born: Jordan Kamčev; 24 July 1970 (age 56); Skopje, SR Macedonia, SFR Yugoslavia (present-day North Macedonia)
- Other name: Orce Kamchev
- Education: Skopje University
- Employer: Orka Holding
- Spouses: Olga Kostova (m. 2002–2006) Ana Gjorgjieva (m. 2007)
- Website: orka.mk

Jordan "Orce" Kamchev (Macedonian: Јордан "Орце" Камчев) is a Macedonian businessman. According to Forbes, he was the richest person in North Macedonia in 2015, with net a worth of 228 million euros.

== Companies ==
- Hospital Acibadem Sistina (2010)
- Media Print Macedonia (2004)
- Skopsko Pole
- Stopanska Banka AD Bitola
- Pelagonija Energy
- Beton Shtip
- Mont
- Orka Sport
- IBIS Skopje City Center

== Controversies ==
=== Extortion Scandal ===
In the summer 2020, Boki 13 and prosecutor Katica Janeva were imprisoned for money laundering and illegal influence due to their attempts to extort Kamchev for €1.5 million.

=== Special Prosecution Probes ===
Following the ousting of former Macedonian Prime Minister Nikola Gruevski due to corruption. Kamchev who was reportedly close to his regime has been under investigation by Macedonian prosecutors.

In March 2021, Kamchev was arrested in North Macedonia due to fears that he will try to leave the country. The arrest was in regards to allegations that Kamchev had been involved in a scheme where he purchased land in the Vodno district, Skopje using public money when VMRO-DPMNE was the ruling party.

== Sanctions ==
On 19 July 2023 the U.S. Department of the Treasury’s Office of Foreign Assets Control (OFAC) sanctioned Jordan Kamchev pursuant to E.O. 14033 for being responsible for or complicit in, or having directly or indirectly engaged in, corruption related to the Western Balkans.
