= Uganda Performing Right Society =

Ugandan copyright collective

Uganda Performing Rights Society
- Abbreviation: UPRS
- Founded: 1985; 41 years ago
- Type: Not for profit
- Location(s): Kampala, Uganda (Headquarters)
- Region served: Worldwide
- Key people: Antony Mwandha(CEO); ~~Moses Matovu(late)~~ (Chairman)
- Employees: 20 (2015)
- Website: uprs.go.ug

The Uganda Performing Rights Society (UPRS) was formed in 1985 by authors (mainly musicians) to advance the cause of copyright administration in Uganda. It registered with the Registrar of Companies as a Company Limited by Guarantee having no share capital as it belongs to all of its members.

UPRS is recognized by the Government as a Collecting Society and it is a Member of the Confederation of International Societies of Authors and Composers (CISAC).

== Copyright society objectives ==
- To promote the economic and social well-being of members.
- To promote and encourage creativity in artistic, literary, and scientific works in Uganda.
- To make reciprocal representation agreements with foreign societies.
- To foster understanding between members and users of their works.
- To provide members and any other interested persons with information relating to and neighboring rights.

== Global affiliations ==
UPRS is an affiliate member of CISAC and has signed direct reciprocal representation agreements with several Societies from countries across the world for the exclusive control and administration of their copyrights in Uganda. UPRS is associate of World Intellectual Property Organization (WIPO) and African Regional Intellectual Property Organization (ARIPO).

In 2004, the World Intellectual Property Organisation (WIPO) donated a Workstation to Uganda and Government presented it to UPRS to manage copyrights effectively and in conformity with international standards. UPRS entered into Reciprocal Agreements with other societies worldwide under the auspices of CISAC.

UPRS protects foreign and local works falling within Uganda while other Societies protect works in their respective countries.
