= Obangaina =

Song by Rachel Magoola

Single by Rachel Magoola
- Released: 1999
- Genre: Folk-pop-dance
- Length: 4:10
- Songwriter: Rachel Magoola

"Obangaina" is a song recorded by Rachel Magoola with Afrigo Band and released in 1999. In 2021, singer YKee Benda recorded a cover of the song for his 2021 album Kirabo.

== Composition ==
Ykee Benda was a very young boy when the original song was released in 1999. He said he redid the song because it was his biggest childhood memory. He moved to Eastern Uganda to look for Rachel Magoola to obtain her permission and blessings to redo Obangaina. Rachel Magoola put her parliamentary calendar on hold for a day and first listened to Benda's request before letting him do the song. She later supervised the production and recording of the song. Ykee Benda noted that if she had not liked the outcome, he would not have released the song. In his version, Benda replaces the name Margaret with Wycliffe, the man who is seducing his wife, and turns the song into a story of a man whose wife cheats on him with Wycliffe. The song was recorded at Mpaka Records by Kraizy Beats featuring guitars by Myco Ouma, Bass guitar by Samuel Muhindo, horns by Emmanuel Dragu, Backup vocals by Namara Kakama, and Nase Avatar on mixing and mastering. Benda performed the song live at UG Connect Concert on NBS TV.

== Video ==
A commercial dance video was made for the song. It came out on YouTube on 23 August 2021. It featured Ykee Benda dancing with The Tripplet Ghetto Kids. The dance moves were choreographed by Eddie Wizzy and the video was directed by IVASH RS from Mpaka films.

== Reception ==
The song was received with mixed reactions as some audiences were not happy with Benda's delivery while others applauded him. Rachel Magoola also came out in support of Benda and applauded him for reinventing her song for the new generation.
