= Uganda Police Band =

- Origin: Kampala, Uganda
- Genres: Military music, patriotic music
- Years active: 1960s–present
- Past members: Moses Matovu Venancio Okello Josephine Kakooza
- Website: www.police.go.ug

The Uganda Police Band is the sole ensemble of the Uganda Police and the mandated police band of the Republic of Uganda, being stationed in Kampala. It is responsible for playing at police ceremonies and community events. It was founded in the mid-1960s following Ugandan independence. In September 2019, it launched its first affiliated police band in the Lango sub-region.
