= Afrigo Band =

Ugandan musical group

- Also known as: Afrigo
- Origin: Kampala, Uganda
- Genres: African Rumba; Kidandali; Jazz
- Years active: 1975 – present
- Members: Joanita Kawalya, Rachel Magoola, Herman Ssewanyana
- Past members: Frank Mbalire, Moses Matovu(Deceased)

Afrigo Band is a musical band in Uganda. It is the longest-lasting musical group in the history of Uganda, having existed for 51 years by September 2026. It was led by Moses Matovu until his death on 24 September 2026.

== History ==
The band was formed by a group of eight musicians led by their band leader, vocalist, and alto saxophonist, Moses Matovu, who continued to lead the band on its 38th anniversary. Playing to their fans at home in Uganda, the group tours regularly in Europe and the United States to play to Ugandans in the Diaspora. Moses Matovu performed with the band since and was its leader until his death on 24 September 2026. The eight founding band members were:

- Moses Matovu
- Charles Ssekyanzi
- Jeff Sewava
- Paddy Nsubuga
- Paulo Serumagga
- Fred Luyombya
- Anthony Kyeyune
- Geoffrey Kizito

== Band members ==
As of January 2015, all except one of the founding band members had died. The band recruited replacements whenever a member left or died. Members of the band, past and present, include:

- Moses Matovu - founder member, band leader, saxophonist, lead vocals, composer
- Deo Mukungu - member, vocalist
- Herman Ssewanyana - congas
- Charles Ssekyanzi Mutagubya - vocalist, trumpet player, composer
- Mansur Bulegeya Akiki - tenor saxophonist
- Joanita Kawalya - vocalist, dancer
- Rachael Magoola - vocalist, dancer, composer
- Rashid Musoke - member
- Paul Serumaga - founder member
- Godfrey Mwambala - founder member, pianist, drummer, composer, guitarist
- Tony Sengo - member
- Tonny Ssenkebejje - solo guitarist
- Fred Kigozi - member
- Peter Bazanye - vocals
- Joe Tabula - vocals
- Frank Mbalire guitarist/vocals
- Edmond Ganja - guitarist/vocals
- Sammy Kasule - bassist/vocals
- Charles Busuulwa - bassist
- Eric Sabiiti - drummer
- Julious Nshaba - drummer
- Daniel Kaggwa - keyboards
- Isaac Zzimbe - drummer
- Jacinta Wamboga - dancer
- Sarah Namiyonga - dancer
- Aminye Rhoose - dancer

== Discography ==
Some of the records and albums released by the band include the following:

Year	Name of Record	Composer
	Afrigo Batuuse	
	Akola Bwenkanya	Charles Ssenkyanzi
	Musa	Charles Ssenkyanzi
	Enneyisa	Charles Ssenkyanzi
	Rose Guma	Charles Ssenkyanzi
	Onnemye	Charles Ssenkyanzi
	Nnemeddwa	Charles Ssenkyanzi
1999	Obangaina	Rachael Magoola
	Sipiidi Kendeeza	
	Olumbe Lwo'bwaavu	
	Sikulimba (Olunderebu)	
	Jim	Joanita Kawalya

== Recent developments ==
In January 2015, Afrigo Band began regular performances at Club Silk, in Kampala's Industrial area, every Friday evening. Although the club attracts a predominantly young audience, with the arrival of Afrigo, Club Silk is expected to ring in more mature revelers, above the age of 40 years. In November 2015, the band celebrated its 40th anniversary with a sold-out concert at Hotel Africana, in Kampala.

== See also ==
- African Rumba
- Kidandali
- Milege
- Undercover Brothers Ug
- Goodlyfe Crew
- Blu*3
- Sauti Ya Africa
