= Mukakamanzi Beatha =

Rwandan actress

- Born: Mukakamanzi Beatha; 1983 (age 42–43); Kigali, Rwanda
- Occupations: Actress and Singer
- Children: 6 children and 4 grand children

Mukakamanzi Beatha (born in Gasabo District) is a Rwandan actress. One of the most popular actresses in Rwanda, Beatha is best known in Giramata film as 'Giramata's mother' and in City maid as Nick's mother.

== Personal life ==
Beatha Mukakamanzi was born in Gatsibo District.

She got married in 1983 and is a mother of 6 children and 4 grand children.

== Career ==
Her maiden film acting came through the film The Deadly Spear. After the film, she acted in several popular films such as Rwasibo, Intare y’Ingore, Giramata n’izindi, It's Not the End, Dreams, Enemy of Love, Conclusion, and Make Milk. She then joined the popular television series City Maid.

she is known as Madalina in film called Inzozi series, directed by Muniru Habiyakare and Felix kamanzi, and produced by Ndayirukiye Fleury and Rugwizangoga Tharcisse. This film is written for supporting marriages because in our days marriage is no longer stronger than before. It's for the contribution of many people found in Rwandan cinema and journalist.

== Partial filmography ==
Year	Film	Role	Genre	Ref.
2019	The 600: The Soldiers' Story		Documentary	
