= KBC Channel 1 =

- Country: Kenya
- Broadcast area: Kenya
- Headquarters: Kenya Broadcasting Corporation, Harry Thuku Road, Nairobi

Programming
- Languages: English, Swahili

Ownership
- Owner: Kenya Broadcasting Corporation
- Sister channels: KTN News Kenya

History
- Launched: 1 October 1962; 63 years ago

Links
- Website: www.kbc.co.ke

KBC Channel 1 is the flagship television channel of the Kenya Broadcasting Corporation and the country's oldest television channel, founded in 1962. It was Kenya's only television channel until the appearance of the Kenya Television Network in 1990.

== History ==
A Television Commission was set up in December 1959 where radio, at the time under the control of the Kenya Broadcasting Service, and television, should be put under the auspices of a single corporation, independent from the state. The results were revealed in 1960, with the aim of operating it as an independent service, but not controlled by commercial interests. A dedicated television corporation was established in November 1961. In early 1962, by means of a separate statute, the contract for the television network of Kenya was given to Television Network (Kenya) Ltd. of Nairobi in association with the British Marconi company. The plan was to launch the service by 1 October and brought British technicians to assist in the building of a transmitting station in Limuru, northwest of Nairobi.

Broadcasts started on 1 October 1962, fifteen months before it achieved its independence. By 1964 it had become a key figure in the independence process. KBC, however, was a lossmaker during fiscal 1962–1963, largely because the target audience consisted largely of viewers of European and South Asian descent. The station was nationalised on 1 July 1964, under Voice of Kenya, and operated as a commercial service. A second transmitter was subsequently built at Timbora and a third one for Mombasa was in planning stages. The Mombasa station started in 1971, being independent from the Nairobi station, having its own schedule.

Colour television broadcasts began in 1978, though in its early years, the shortage in trained television technicians, used to black and white equipment, accelerated. It did acquire colour equipment before 1978, but was still operating in black and white.

In September 2000, KBC commissioned a second channel, Metro TV, beaming sports and entertainment programming to Nairobi. On 13 September 2001, it inked an agreement to relay CNN International on its frequency network. KTN was the sole relayer in the country until then.

KBC Channel 1 rebranded on 21 June 2021. The goal was to attemptedly regain trust by hiring some of its former presenters.
