= Makerere University School of Women and Gender Studies =

School in Uganda

Makerere University School of Women & Gender Studies
- Type: Public
- Established: July 1, 1990; 35 years ago
- Dean: Professor Sarah Ssali
- Location: Kampala, Uganda
- Campus: Urban

Makerere University School of Women and Gender Studies (MSWGS) is one of the schools that comprise the Makerere University College of Humanities and Social Sciences, a constituent college of Makerere University, Uganda's oldest and largest public university. Established in 1991, the mission is to provide intellectual leadership for mainstreaming gender in all aspects of economic, political and social – cultural development.

== See also ==
- Education in Uganda
