= Frank Mbalire =

Uganda musician

- Born: Kampala Uganda
- Occupation: Musician

Frank Mbalire is a Ugandan musician and guitarist. He was one of the members of Afrigo Band.

== Early life and education ==
Mbalire was born in Natete Kampala to Joseph Yawe and Dorotia Nambi.

== Music ==
Mbalire joined Afrigo Band in the late 70s as a rhythm guitarist but later moved to "Thames band", from where he composed "Bamuleete" and "Sirikusuula". He relocated to Sweden for sometime before returning to Afrigo band. In 2009, Mbalire left Afrigo to form "Misty Jazz band", which also has Moses Matovu and had made Kampala Casino their home. He was a member of "Blazing beats" with Philly Lutaaya and Fred Kigozi.

His song "Ndikwambalanga Ekkooti" was voted by Bukedde as one of the most influential songs in Uganda in the last fifty years.

== Discography ==
=== Singles ===
- Bamuleete
- Akanakakawalya
- Ndikwambalanga Ekkooti
- Sirikusuula

=== Albums ===
- African songs, 1989
