= Sauti Ya Africa =

- Also known as: Sauti ya Africa
- Origin: Kampala - Uganda
- Genres: Classic; Pop music Gospel
- Years active: 2007 – Present
- Members: Francis Mutesasira, Benjamin Katumba, and George Semaganda

Sauti Ya Africa (SYA) ("Voice Of Africa" in Swahili), the Commonwealth Music Ambassadors, is a musical group in Uganda. It is a trio of three men who have been performing together since circa 2005.

== History ==
The band members were drawn together by their collective love of music, before they started the group. The group was mentored by Ulrike Wilson, the representative of the IMF in Uganda at the time. All members graduated from the UK-based Associated Board of the Royal Schools of Music (ABRSM).In 2007 they were invited to sing during the Commonwealth Heads of Government Meeting 2007, held in Kampala, Uganda's capital city.

== Band members ==
Benjamin Katumba, a bass baritone, who was a member of Bunamwaya Church Choir, from the age of eight years. Later he was a member of Namirembe Cathedral Choir while in high school at Mengo Secondary School. He graduated with a Bachelor of Arts degree in music, from Makerere University.

Francis Derrick Mutesasira, a baritone, joined Namirembe Cathedral Choir as a boy chorister, rising through the ranks to become the choir's music director. He attended King's College Budo, before joining Makerere University, where he graduated with a Bachelor of Science in urban planning.

George Ssemaganda, a high baritone, is a visual artist. He was a lead singer of The Baxmba waves band. It was his desire to improve his vocal ability, that led him to enroll with a Private Vocal Tutor, where he met the other two.

== International fame ==
After a series of performances locally, the trio's silky harmonies got international acclaim which led to several engagements in Europe performing with world renowned Mezzo Soprano Katherine Jenkins and for world leaders including Rothschild family, Rockefeller family, President Obasanjo, Tony Elumelu Foundation, Bill Clinton and many more in 2014. S.Y.A (Sauti Ya Africa) later that year were invited by the Mayor of London to perform for the British royal family. This led to them being crowned Commonwealth Music Ambassadors by Elizabeth II.
