= TV1 (Rwandan TV channel) =

Rwandan television channel

- Country: Rwanda
- Broadcast area: National
- Headquarters: Kigali

Programming
- Languages: English and Kinyarwanda

Ownership
- Owner: Kakooza Nkuliza Charles

History
- Launched: February 2014 (12 years ago)

TV1 is a Rwandan television channel founded by Kakooza Nkuliza Charles in 2014, and is one of the first private channels to start operating in the country. Charles also owns the radio station Radio 1 Rwanda, which started broadcasting in 2012, and Gasogi United Football Club, which was formed in 2016.

== History ==
TV1 started broadcasting in February 2014 and claims to be Rwanda's most popular channel. At the time of launching, it was one of the five television stations in operation. The channel emerged in the year when Rwanda finished its analog television signals, in 2014 alone, TV1's breakfast show became popular for its call-in forum where viewers gave their opinion on current events.

On the morning of 1 May 2014, its studios were attacked by a group of people who attempted to injure one of its staff, following an incident held at Club Next that led to the death of a person in its front.

On 10 September 2017, the channel started airing branded content program Coke Studio Africa for the first time in Rwanda. In 2021, the channel aired Ejo si Kera, a series with educational goals, which also aired on Rwanda Television. The channel is also available on Canal+ Afrique.

On 16 July 2019, TV1 journalist Constantin Tuyishimire was found missing. Within a week, it was discovered that he was in hiding in Uganda after dodging reporting a news item in Gucumbi District. On 18 May 2020, the channel was one of six to air the StarTimes-sponsored StarTimes GO program acting as a showcase of its products. An edition of Rirarashe on 17 November 2021 featuring Rwanda National Police spokesman John Bosco Kabera about speed limits caused massive shock on social media.

Numerous TV1 journalists were fired on 6 January 2023, largely due to adverse economic effects caused by the pandemic. The letters were formally sent on 9 January (6 January was a Friday) to the affected employees and presenters. Some decided to take the issue to the court to restore their jobs.
