= Seburikoko =

Rwandan comedy television series

- Genre: Sitcom; Drama
- Created by: Misago Nelly Wilson
- Written by: Misago Nelly Wilson; Denis
- Directed by: Denis
- Presented by: RTV/RBA
- Starring: Gratien Niyitegeka; Antoinette Uwamahoro; Ernest Kalisa; Mediatrice Muhutukazi; Leocadie Uwabeza; Gasasira Jean Pierre; Umuganwa Sarah; Chantal Nyakubyara; Clapton Kibonge; Noella Niyomubyeyi; Léon Ngabo
- Country of origin: Rwanda
- Original language: rw
- No. of seasons: 31
- No. of episodes: 468

Production
- Producer: Misago Nelly Wilson
- Production location: Rwanda
- Cinematography: Habarurema Mustafa
- Editor: Eric Ingabikwiye
- Camera setup: Single Camera
- Running time: 20-30 Minutes
- Production company: Zacu Entertainment LTD

Original release
- Network: Rwanda Television
- Release: 2015 – 2023

Related
- City Maid

Seburikoko is a Rwandan comedy television series created by Misago Nelly Wilson, that started production through Afrifame Ltd and later continued its production under Zacu Entertainment Ltd. The series began airing on Rwanda Television (RTV) in March 2015. The series consists of 31 seasons co-written by Mutiganda Janvier and Wilson. It was directed by Jones Kennedy Mazimpaka and many other directors with post production by Samples Studios.

It stars an ensemble cast consisting of Rwanda comedian Niyitegeka Gratien as title character Seburikoko, Antoinette Uwamahoro as his wife, Siperansiya, as well as Erneste Kalisa, Ngabo Leo, and Muhutukazi Mediatrice. Seburikoko became one of the most popular television programs on Rwanda Television. At the end of season 4 (in March 2016), the television series commissioned four more seasons, ending in March 2017.

The series went on a one-year hiatus starting in 2023. In October 2024, it was announced that it will be resumed.

== New Synopsis ==
Seburikoko, the rich and powerful boss of Gatoto village, became a major figure after winning 50 million Rwf in a lottery. He plans to transform Gatoto and help people with support from Jean Pierre de Mouton's son. But the story behind his money isn't so simple as it seems. Kibonke, his driver knowns the truth. Seburikoko offers him a deal to stay quiet and become his personal secretary and driver. The question is: will Kibonke keep the secret or expose it and ruin Seburikoko's plans?

== Cast ==
- Niyitegeka Gratien as Seburikoko
- Antoinette Uwamahoro as Siperansiya
- Umuganwa Sarah as Mutoni
- Mugisha Emmanuel as Kibonge
- Late Chantal Nyakubyara as Nyiramana
- Ernest Kalisa as Rulinda
- Léon Ngabo as Kadogo
- Noella Niyomubyeyi as Liliane

== Recognition ==
At the fifth edition of Rwanda Movie Awards, the TV Series received eight nominations

- winning awards for Best TV Series,
- Best Director,
- Best Cinematographer, and
- Best Sound Engineer.

== Synopsis ==
Seburikoko recounts the story of a man called Seburikoko, known as Sebu due to his reputation as a wealthy man in the neighborhood of the fictional village of Gatoto. He does not help his family, spending his time drinking and selling home possessions. His wife, Siperansiya, does everything to feed the family.

Their only child, Mutoni, who they were unable to put in school, moved to Kigali to seek a better life. However, the time comes for her to come back home. The story centers around the family's efforts to change her father's habits.
