= 1TV (Macedonian TV channel) =

1TV 1ТВ
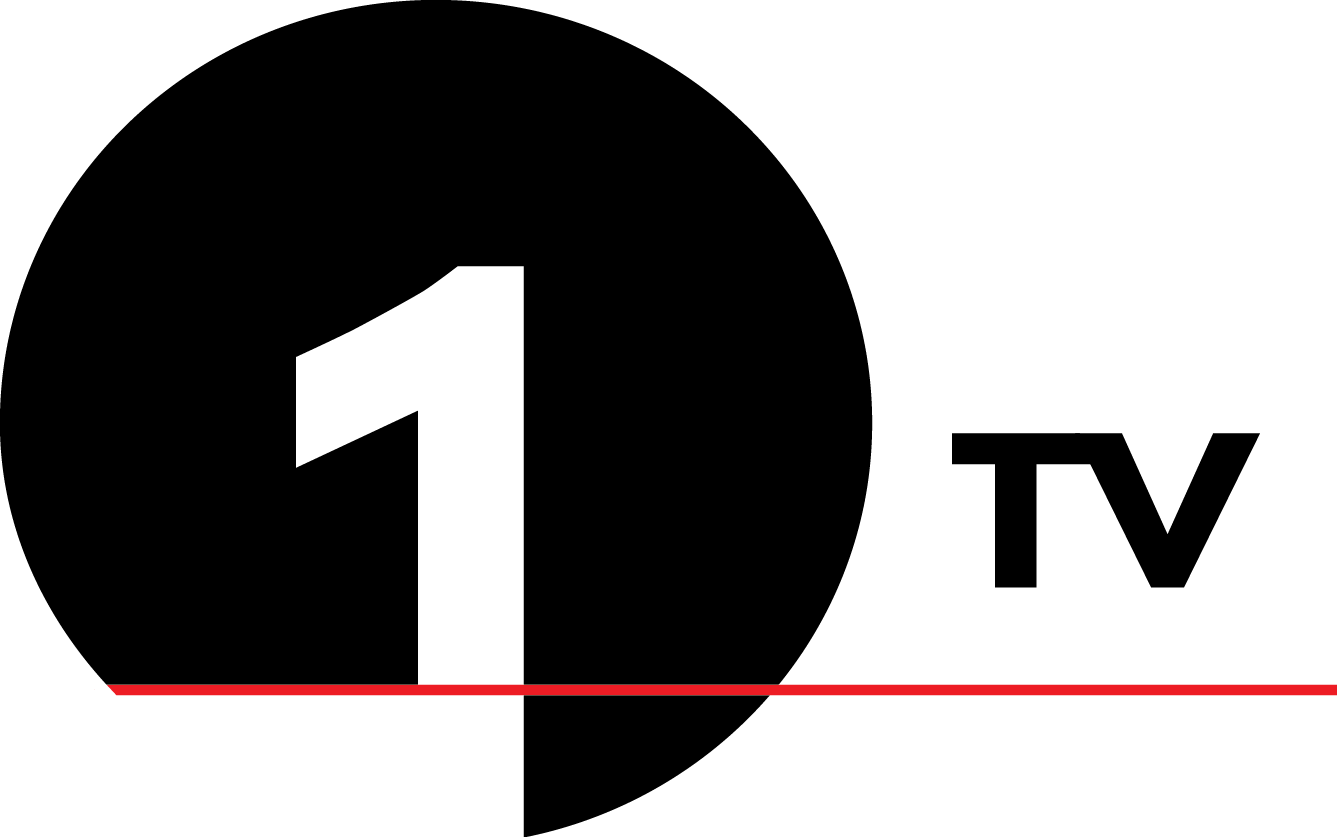
- Country: North Macedonia
- Broadcast area: North Macedonia
- Headquarters: Skopje

Programming
- Language: Macedonian
- Picture format: 16:9

Ownership
- Owner: BMJ MEDIA GROUP DOO Skopje

History
- Launched: 29 March 2018
- Closed: 5 September 2019

Links
- Website: 1tv.mk

1TV was a television channel in North Macedonia. The editor was Aco Kabranov. It was the owner of the company BMJ MEDIA GROUP DOO Skopje was Mile Jovanovski.

== History ==
Its broadcasts started on 29 March 2018 as a linear television network, contrary to the initial announcements that said that the channel was limited to the internet.

The channel ceased broadcasting on 5 September 2019, likely due to Bojan Jovanovski, nicknamed "Boki 13", being one of the elements of the "Racket" case.
