= Josephine Kakooza =

Ugandan former police officer

CP Josephine Kakooza
- Born: Josephine Kakooza; 8 June 1955; Masaka District, Uganda
- Died: 9 January 2019 (aged 63)
- Other name: Maama Police
- Education: Trinity College Nabbingo
- Police career
- Country: Uganda
- Department: Music, Dance and Drama
- Service years: 1969–2019
- Rank: Commissioner of Police
- Awards: Distinguished Service Medal of The Uganda Police Force; Long Service with Good Conduct Medal of The Uganda Police Force; National Independence Medal

Josephine Kakooza (8 June 1955 – 9 January 2019) was a Ugandan police officer, Police Band leader and former Commissioner of Police (CP). In December 2011 she was named the Director of Music in the Uganda Police Force making her the first woman to occupy this position. She was also a composer and played the flute.

== Background and education ==
Kakooza was born in 1955 at Villa Maria Hospital, Masaka to a former Buganda county chief, Joseph Kakooza and Theodora Namutebi Kakooza

She attended Ntinda Nursery School, Nabagereka Primary School and then St.Agnes Naggalama between 1960 and 1966. Between 1966 – 1968 she attended Trinity College, Nabbingo then later joined the Uganda Police Force in 1970. In between, she attended nursing school at The Butabika Hospital Nursing School

While with the Uganda Police Force, underwent went weaponry training in 1973 and did a Junior Command Course in 1997 and other several courses in and outside the country. She was also had a certificate in counseling HIV/AIDS patients obtained under The Aids Support Organisation (TASO).

== Career ==
On 1 September 1969 she enlisted for a 3-month training with the Uganda Police Force, and graduated as Band Woman Constable on 2 December 1969. She also underwent a two-year training at the Kibuli Police Training School and was then deployed to the Police Band under the music department.

In the main force Kakooza started out as a Probation Police Constable (PPC), then was promoted to police constable and later corporal in 1982, before becoming a sergeant in 1987.

In 1993, she was promoted to Assistant Inspector of Police and in February 2000 became a full Police Inspector. Later on she was promoted to Assistant Superintendent of Police (2004) and then Superintendent in 2008. Four years later in 2012, she was named an Assistant Commissioner of Police(ACP)

Having reached the Uganda's public service mandatory requirement age in 2013, Kakooza instead had her contract extended on grounds of exemplary service.

As the Uganda Police Force made 100 years in 2014, Kakooza was one of the officers promoted to the rank of Commissioner of Police by President Yoweri Museveni.

According to her obituary from the Uganda Police Force, she was stationed at Nsambya Police Band Unit where she served until her death in 2019

== Commendations and awards ==
- Distinguished Service Medal of The Uganda Police Force (awarded to individuals for exceptional service)
- Long Service with Good Conduct Medal of The Uganda Police Force (awarded to officers who have served for 30 and more years)
- National Independence medal

== Personal life ==
Kakooza took up farming in her later years in Mukono. She had four children. Kahooza was buried in Namumira in Mukono District.

== See also ==
- Uganda Police Force
- Uganda Police Band
