= Jai Telangana TV =

Indian Telugu-language television news channel

- Country: India
- Network: TV9 Network
- Headquarters: Hyderabad, Telangana, India

Programming
- Language: Telugu

Ownership
- Owner: Associated Broadcasting Company Private Limited (ABCPL)

History
- Replaced: TV1

Jai Telangana TV is a Telugu language news television channel in the southern Indian state of Telangana. It is owned and operated by Associated Broadcasting Company Private Limited (ABCL) which also owns the news channel TV9 Telugu.
