= Norsk TV1 =

Norwegian television station

Norsk TV1 was a Norwegian television station. Norsk TV1 started in 1989. It was focused on Norwegian shows and films, and produced a lot of entertainment shows for its weekend programming. Norsk TV1 had its first test broadcasts in December 1988, but did not start with regular broadcasts until February 1989. Norsk TV1 was advertising-financed and was owned by Orkla. It was the second private Norwegian channel to be established in Norway after TVNorge in 1988. It was closed down in June 1989 due to financial problems and was taken over by TVNorge. TV1 had a lot of own productions, including the talk show program Wesenstund with Rolv Wesenlund, which quickly became the channel's big attraction. This program re-emerged on TVNorge in 1994.

The channel was led by Arnfinn Storkaas. Rolv Wesenlund was another key player in the channel.

== Program overview and history ==
The channel's opening program was called Åpent hus (Open House) and was broadcast on December 16, 1988. It was presented by Connie Barr and Hans Gunnar Skarstein. Wenche Foss, Øivind Blunck and Leif Juster were guests in the program. Later on premiere night, Rolv Wesenlund introduced his talk show program Wesenstund, with Kari Stokke at the grand piano.

Norsk TV1 started its regular broadcasts on Friday, February 17, 1989.

Norsk TV1 had (in contrast to TVNorge) a higher number of in-house productions within topics such as sports, music, travel magazines, food programs, debate and conversation programs. The large proportion of in-house productions became an expensive element and was the reason why the channel ended up in financial incapacity after only a few months in operation. The financial situation meant that its owner, Orkla, left Norsk TV1 and switched to TVNorge. TVNorge took over the operation of Norsk TV1 on 16 June 1989. Some of Norsk TV1's programs, including Wesenstund, were set up on TVNorge for a short period after the takeover.

There were about 1 million people in Norway who had the opportunity to take in the channel at the start. Around 220,000 viewers visited the channel the first weekend they had broadcasts.

Norsk TV1 failed mostly due to spending huge amounts of money on Norwegian productions without having the network to spread these broadcasts into most people's homes. TVNorge succeeded by first broadcasting cheap imports and then supplementing with local productions. The shows they got from TV1, particularly an evening show with popular host Rolv Wesenlund, were important in TVNorge's successful fight to become the second widely distributed commercial channel in Norway.
