= Indoto =

Rwandan Drama television series

- Genre: Drama
- Created by: Misago Nelly Wilson
- Written by: Ndizeye Alibaba
- Directed by: Busine Israel
- Presented by: RTV
- Starring: Dusenge Clenia; Irankunda Pacifique; Igihozo Nshuti Mireille; Azabe Jabes; Mutoni Saranda Oliva; Mugisha James; Niyigena Jean Pierre; Muvunyi Ange Nina
- Country of origin: Rwanda
- Original language: Kinyarwanda
- No. of seasons: 12
- No. of episodes: 144

Production
- Producer: Misago Nelly Wilson
- Cinematography: xxx
- Editor: Friend Meshak
- Camera setup: Multi-camera
- Running time: 20–30 min
- Production company: Zacu Entertainment LTD

Original release
- Network: RTV
- Release: 2020 – present

Indoto is a Rwandan drama TV series created by Misago Nelly Wilson. It premiered in 2020, through Zacu Entertainment Ltd production, and airs on Rwanda Television (RTV).

The story has now 12 seasons with over 140 episodes.

This series is based on Muhire, a young man who couldn’t get a job immediately after high school, was deceived by his old friend who brought him to Kigali. Upon reaching, he tricked him and disappeared – only to leave Muhire alone to fight for his own survival in a city unbeknownst to him.

== Cast ==
- Dusenge Clenia
- Irankunda Pacifique
- Igihozo Nshuti Mireille
- Azabe Jabes
- Mutoni Saranda Oliva
- Mugisha James
- Niyigena Jean Pierre
- Muvunyi Ange Nina
