= TV1 (Portugal) =

Proposed Portuguese television channel

TV1 - Rede Independente, also simply known as TV1, was a proposed plan for a Portuguese private television channel, as one of the three bids for one of the two networks. Owned by Daniel Proença de Carvalho, it was thrown out in February 1992.

== History ==
Former RTP director Proença de Carvalho submitted his bid for a private television channel, TV1, in April 1991. In case it would win the tender, the channel would deposit 30% of its capital.

TV1 presented its schedule on 15 May 1991. 56% of the output was to be produced in Portugal, with support from independent production companies. As of July, it had received eight million contos in funding: TVI had six million and SIC, twelve million. The network had an ambitious project, such as a high number of broadcast hours per day, aiming at a mass market.

On 6 February 1992, the licenses were given to SIC and TVI, putting TV1 out. Proença de Carvalho criticized the winners due to political interference, but remained neutral in the defeat.
