= The Bishop's Family =

Rwandan Drama television series

- Genre: Family; Drama
- Created by: Misago Nelly Wilson
- Written by: Niyoyita Roger; NDIZEYE Alibaba
- Directed by: Niyoyita Roger
- Presented by: ZACU TV
- Starring: Mwiyeretsi Alain Samson; Rutayisire Bloda; Tuyisenge Aime Valens; Gatesi Divine; Dusenge Clenia; Iradukunda Abouba Ibra
- Country of origin: Rwanda
- Original language: Kinyarwanda
- No. of seasons: 4
- No. of episodes: 52

Production
- Producer: Misago Nelly Wilson
- Production location: Rwanda
- Cinematography: Bora
- Editor: Olivier ABIMANA
- Camera setup: Double Camera
- Running time: 20-30 Minutes
- Production company: Zacu Entertainment LTD

Original release
- Network: ZACU TV
- Release: 2022 – 2023

Related
- City Maid

The Bishop's Family is a Rwandan drama TV series created by Misago Nelly Wilson, produced through Zacu Entertainment Ltd. The series was premiered on the launch of ZACU TV on October 1, 2022, and began airing on October 3 when the TV officially started its programme. The series consists of four seasons written and directed by Niyoyita Roger.

== Cast ==
- Mwiyeretsi Alain Samson as Bishop Dan
- Rutayisire Bloda as Jane
- Tuyisenge Aime Valens as Pastor Philippe
- Gatesi Divine as Rebe
- Dusenge Clenia as Audrey
- Iradukunda Abouba Ibra as Andrew

== Recognition ==
At the eighth edition of Rwanda International Movie Awards, the TV Series received the first award for Best TV Series in East Africa.

== Synopsis ==
The Bishop's Family recounts the story of a man, Bishop Dan, who is an honest, caring and particularly appreciated religious leader in his community. He is also a proponent of interfaith dialogue and therefore pretty close to other religious authorities, like Imam Bilal and Pastor Joseph. Serving God and helping people has always been His calling, and his commitment to the cause is unparalleled. He regularly welcomes his community members in his office to listen to their problems, hear their confessions, give them advice or to try to help them as much as possible. On the other hand, his wife, Jane, is less spiritual and more pragmatic. She owns a very successful beauty salon which doubles as a life coaching / couple therapy / “new age” weight loss consultancy. She's literally the breadwinner of the family, and has always financially supported her husband, their children as well as the church activities. Yet most of the community despise her. Indeed, her sex appeal, apparent arrogance and ostentatious materialism seem to rub many people the wrong way. Unsurprisingly, she also provokes quite a bit of jealousy and envy.

Due to her twisted past, Jane and her loved ones suffer the suspenseful cycle of blackmailing, manipulation, and violence. What will Jane do to protect her family from the threats? How will she preserve her secret? Truth unrevealing in the seasons.
