= Misago Nelly Wilson =

Rwandan content Creator and producer. The CEO of Zacu Entertainment

Misago Wilson
- Born: Misago Wilson; 14 December 1985 (age 40); Kigali, Rwanda
- Other name: Nelly
- Education: University of Rwanda’s College of Business and Economics
- Occupations: Entrepreneur, Producer, content creator, writer
- Years active: 2009–present
- Television: Seburikoko, City Maid, Indoto, EJO SI KERA
- Spouse: Hilarie Uwabimfura
- Children: 2
- Awards: Rwanda Movies awards

Misago Wilson (born 14 December 1985), sometimes as Misago Nelly Wilson, is a Rwandan film producer, He is the Chief executive Officer (CEO) of Zacu Entertainment, a production and distribution house in Rwanda. He is best known as the writer of critically acclaimed television drama serials such as Inshuti (Friends), Seburikoko and City Maid, Indoto. He is also a content creator, writer and producer who works in both film and television. He is also a creator and producer of the drama series "Ejo Si Kera" in cooperation with Imbuto foundation which airs on Rwanda Television (RTV)

== Personal life ==
Misago Wilson was born in Gisagara District, Rwanda. In 2010, he obtained a degree in finance from School of Finance and Banking, (currently known as University of Rwanda’s College of Business and Economics: UR-CBE).

In 2013, he married his longtime partner, Hilarie Uwabimfura. The wedding ceremony took place at Remera-Kigali. He is a father of two sons. In January 2014 his 1st son was born and the second was born in Feb 2018.

== Career ==
Wilson Misago, in 2009, joined Inyarwanda as a journalist. In 2010, he became the marketing manager of Inyarwanda Limited, where he was later promoted to the post of Managing director. In 2012, he worked as a radio presenter at City Radio and created entertainment and story on Inyarwanda.com. In 2013, he created the serial Ubu n’ejo which did not become popular. However, in 2014, Misago created the television sitcom Inshuti which aired on TV10. The series is considered as the first ever TV series to be produced locally. With its success, he created a soap Seburikoko which became one of the most popular television dramas in Rwanda. The series aired on Rwanda Television.

Then in late 2014, he created and produced City Maid, another urban series aired on RTV. It also highly popularized among the public. In 2017, he wrote and directed the short film Little Skater. Later in the year, he founded the audiovisual company 'Afrifame Limited', which deals with television content production and photography services.

He is founder of the Zacu TV, the first Rwandan subscription video on demand (VOD) platform broadcasting Rwandan films and series. It was officially unveiled at the Transform Africa Summit 2019.

Mid-year 2022, Zacu TV was acquired by Canal+ Group with the intention of strengthening audio-visual production in Rwanda; enriching the local content market; and reflecting the creativity and talents of different generations of actors, actresses, directors, and other artists. Zacu TV is now available on Canal+ decoders through Ikaze subscription on channel 99.

in 2024, Misago Nelly Wilson created the first-ever sitcom series Shuwa Dilu which started airing on Zacu TV in June, 2024, which stars the most known comedians in Rwanda namely Gratien Niyitegeka a.k.a papa sava, Ramadhan Benimana a.k.a bamenya, and Eric Nsabimana also known as dogiteri Nsabi. Shuwa Dilu talks about a story of Superi, Waxi, and London living in a rented house where the house itself serves as the central hub of the show, with various rooms and spaces becoming the backdrop for different scenes and comedic situations. The living room, kitchen, bedrooms, and the makeshift massage room all become stages for the roommates’ hilarious encounters, misunderstandings, and attempts to navigate their unique living arrangement. As the action occasionally ventures into the surrounding neighborhood, it allows for interactions with recurring supporting characters, like the neighboring houseboys and house girls who frequently finds themselves caught up in London’s shenanigans.

In the recent press conference, Wilson Misago stressed that in 2025, Zacu Entertainment will move to the next level by catalyzing the creativity of young filmmakers. Currently, Zacu TV has many film production projects that will require the participation of several young actors, directors, producers and camera operators. Different series like Hurts Harder which is already being produced by a young producer and Red Flag that will stars large number of youth character.

Recently, Wilson Misago has been recognized and awarded as Best Lifetime Achievement in the category of Movie/Media: Best Star Lifetime Achievement Awards of the year 2025/26 in The Shining Star Africa Award event that was held in Kigali, Rwanda for the first time, after two times being held in South Africa.

== Filmography ==
Year	Film	Role	Genre	Ref.
2013	Ubu n’ejo	producer	TV series	
2013	Inshuti	Writer & producer	TV series	
2014 - 2023	Seburikoko	Creator, co-writer & producer	TV series	
2015–Present	City Maid	Creator and producer	TV series	
2017	The Secret of Happiness	executive producer	Short film	
2017	Baby shower	Writer and director	Short film	
2019–Present	Indoto	Creator and producer	TV series	
2021	EJO SI KERA	Creator, co-writer and producer	TV series	
2022	Igeno Ryanjye	Producer	Feature	
2022 - 2023	The Bishop's Family	Producer	TV series	
2023-2024	ISHUSHO YA PAPA	Creator and Producer	TV series	
2024–Present	Shuwa Dilu	Co-Creator and Producer	TV series	
2024–Present	KALIZA WA KALISA	Producer	TV series	
2024–Present	THE INCUBATION	Executive Producer	Feature	
