= Yuhi Amuli =

Rwandan film director and lawyer (born 1993)

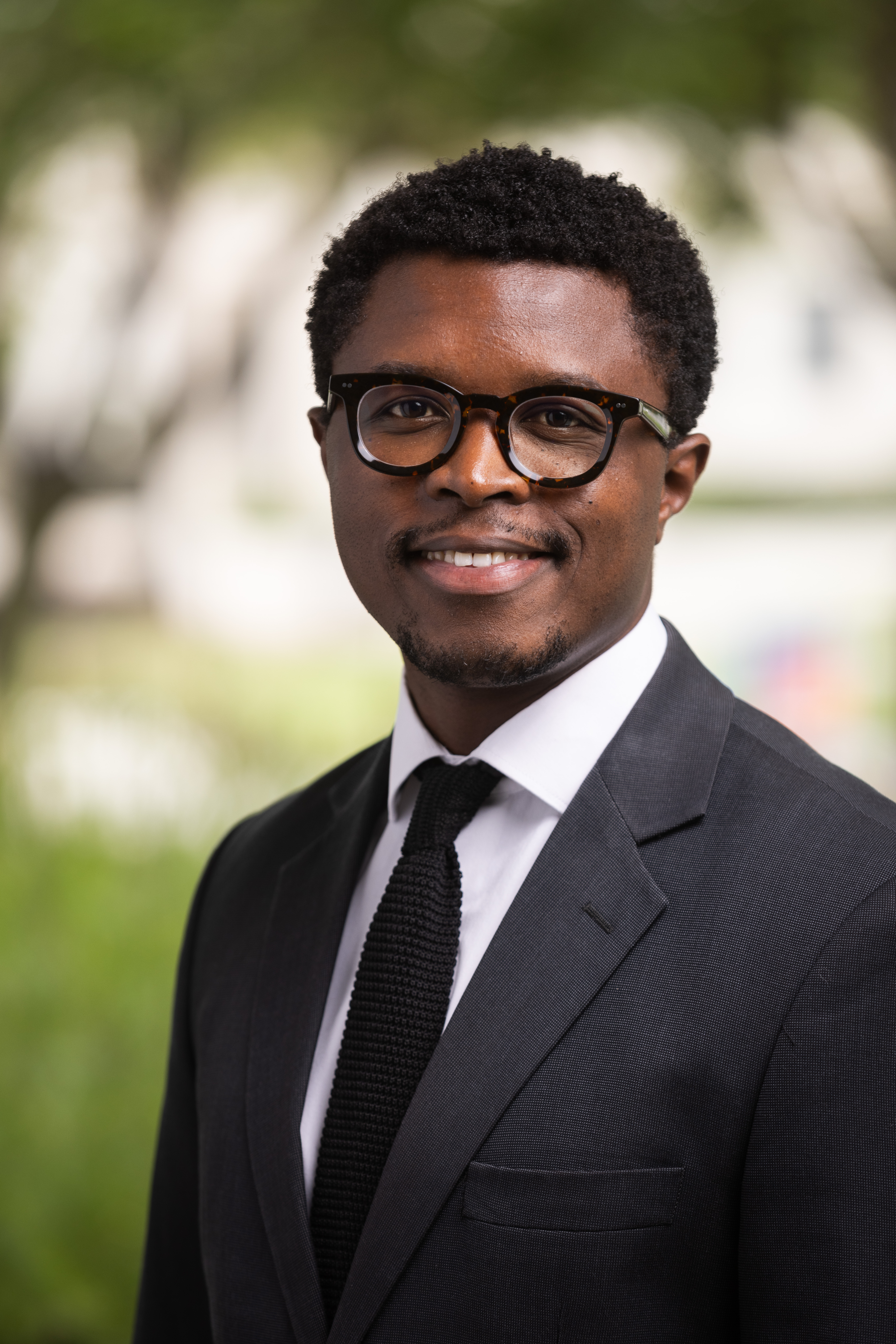
- Born: September 4, 1993 (age 32); Kigali City, Rwanda
- Citizenship: Rwanda
- Education: Loyola Law School, Kigali Independent University
- Occupations: Film director, screenwriter, producer and lawyer
- Years active: 2015-present
- Notable work: Citizen Kwame (2023)
- Height: 6 ft 0 in (183 cm)
- Spouse: Natacha U. Ndekezi (m. 2022)
- Children: 1
- Website: https://yuhiamuli.com

Yuhi Amuli (born 4 September in 1993) is a film director, screenwriter, producer and lawyer from Rwanda. His directorial debut feature film A Taste of Our Land (2020) premiered at the Pan African film festival in Los Angeles and won the Jury Award for Best First Narrative Feature Film. The film went on to screen at various other film festivals worldwide and won the African Movie Academy Awards (2020) for Best First Feature Film by a Director.

== Early life and career ==
Amuli was raised on Nkombo Island, a small and underdeveloped island in Lake Kivu, Rwanda, which lacked access to running water and electricity. His mother worked as a primary school teacher, while his father was an accountant. Despite the limited resources available, Amuli's upbringing emphasized the importance of education and resilience. He attended several screenwriting and directing workshops worldwide; including Maisha Film Lab in 2014.

Amuli gained recognition with his debut feature film, A Taste of Our Land (2020), which is set in an unspecified African country and unfolds against the backdrop of contemporary Chinese involvement in Africa, particularly in the mining sector. It premiered at the Pan African Film Festival in Los Angeles, winning the Jury Award for Best First Narrative Feature Film and the African Movie Academy Award for Best First Feature Film by a Director. It also secured a Best Actor award for Michael Wawuyo Sr at the Festival du Cinéma Africain de Khouribga.

His second feature, Citizen Kwame (2023) follows Kwame, a determined African man aspiring to leave his house. However, to do so, he must first secure a visa from a Western gatekeeper who controls the exits and entries of the house. Only with the assistance of a newly formed relationship with a Western girlfriend does he manage to achieve his goal. It earned the Best Cinematic Treatment award at the 2023 Luxor African Film Festival. In 2017, he produced Nameless through his independent production company, IZACU. The film participated in TAKMIL, a post-production workshop at the Carthage Film Festival in Tunisia, and was later picked up for distribution by Orange Studios in France. He is an alumnus of the Berlinale Talents (2021) and the Toronto Filmmaker Lab (2020). As of 2022, Amuli was currently developing his next film, Exodus.

Amuli holds a bachelor's degree in law from Kigali Independent University and is pursuing a Master of Laws (LL.M.) (class of 2024) with a focus on Entertainment Law at Loyola Law School in Los Angeles.

== Filmography ==
Year	Film	Role	Genre
2023	Citizen Kwame	Director, Screenwriter, Producer, Actor	Feature Film
2023	Uwera	Director, Screenwriter, Producer	TV Feature Film
2021	The young Cyclist	Director	Short Documentary
2020	A Taste of Our Land	Director, Screenwriter, Producer	Feature Film
2019	Kazungu	Director, Screenwriter, Producer	Short Film
2017	Akarwa	Director, Screenwriter	Short Film
2015	Ishaba	Director, Screenwriter	Short Film
