= Kakooza Nkuliza Charles =

Rwandan entrepreneur

- Born: Kakooza Nkuliza Charles; Kampala, Uganda
- Years active: 2004–present
- Title: Media personality, media executive

Kakooza Nkuliza Charles, professionally known as KNC, is a Rwandan media personality and executive. He is the CEO and founder of Radio 1 Rwanda, TV1 Rwanda, and Gasogi United Football Club.

== Background ==
Charles went to high school at Lycee de Kigali, in around 2000. Later, he took courses on media production in Uganda and then started working as a radio presenter and production manager at Flash FM. In 2006, he moved to a new radio station named City Radio.

== Business career ==
In 2012, Charles started a business selling solar energy equipment before going on to launch Radio 1 Rwanda in the same year. He opened TV1 Rwanda in 2014 and founded Gasogi United in 2016.

== Entertainment career ==
While Charles worked in CITY Radio, he wrote, edited and presented an audio series called Doctor Runiga. He was also a CEO and producer at A to Z Production. Charles released songs like "Heart Desire" in 2017 and "Impamvu" in 2018, the same year in which he organized and performed "Legend is Alive" in Kigali with Yvonne Chaka Chaka, Alyn Sano, and Bruce Melodie.
