= City Maid =

Rwandan television drama series

- Genre: Family; Drama
- Created by: Misago Nelly Wilson
- Written by: NGABONZIZA Gad Fred
- Directed by: KWIZERA Ibrahim(Ibra)
- Presented by: RTV
- Starring: Mandali Leon; Ishimwe Sandra; Zahabu Francis; Umuhire Grace; Biringiro Patrick; Irakoze Vanessa
- Country of origin: Rwanda
- Original language: Kinyarwanda
- No. of seasons: 26
- No. of episodes: 312

Production
- Producer: Misago Nelly Wilson
- Production location: Rwanda
- Cinematography: Obed Nshuti
- Editor: Obed Nshuti
- Camera setup: Double Camera
- Running time: 20-30 Minutes
- Production company: Zacu Entertainment LTD

Original release
- Network: Rwanda Television
- Release: 2016 – present

Related
- Seburikoko

City Maid is a Rwandan drama TV series created by Misago Nelly Wilson since June 2016, through Afrifame picture Ltd, this series is being watched on Rwanda Television (RTV)

This series talks about a young village woman who keeps all to herself, comes to the city to seek a new life as a maid in the city’s household. She is ready to start a new life in the big city full of new people, but at the same time, full of challenges she could have never fathomed before. The initial story featured actors and actresses like Assia Mutoni, Emmanuel Ndayizeye, Nadege Uwamwezi, Sandra Ishimwe, Mukakamanzi Beatha, Niyomwungeri Jules, Uwineza Nicole, Hitiyise Davidson. The story kept evolving and now it has 26 seasons with over 300 episodes in total.

== Cast ==
- Mandali Leon
- Ishimwe Sandra
- Zahabu Francis
- Umuhire Grace
- Biringiro Patrick
- Irakoze Vanessa

== Recognition ==
This series has won various awards and nominations like 10 best favorable series in Africa top 10 movies that are breaking African boundaries
