= Moses Matovu =

Ugandan musician (1949–2026)

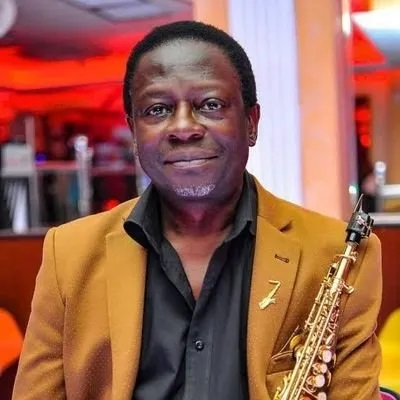
- Born: 19 June 1949; Kampala, Protectorate of Uganda
- Died: 24 September 2026 (aged 77); Kampala, Uganda
- Education: Kibuli Secondary School and later Pillai's Secondary School
- Occupations: Musician, Saxophonist, Vocalist
- Known for: Music
- Title: Co-founder and band leader of Afrigo Band

Moses Matovu (19 June 1949 – 24 September 2026) was a Ugandan saxophonist and singer, best known as the co-founder of Afrigo Band. Formed in 1975, Afrigo Band is one of Uganda’s most celebrated and longest-running musical band. Throughout its history, Matovu served as the band's leader, main instrumentalist, and lead vocalist.

== Early life and education ==
Matovu was born on 19 June 1949 in Kawempe Division, Kampala District, to Abdallah Bukenya and Solome Nakitto. When his parents separated, he moved to Mengo with his mother at the age of five. He spent most of his childhood with his mother.

He attended Namirembe Primary School and later Kibuli Secondary School. He also attended Pillai's Secondary School. However, Matovu's education was cut short in 1966 when traditional institutions were abolished. He was on scholarship from Buganda Kingdom. With no opportunity to continue in school, Matovu concentrated on football and also joined the music industry in 1967 as a vocalist with the Thunderbirds Band.

== Music career ==
Matovu was in Uganda's music industry for nearly 45 years. He started out in Thunderbirds Band in 1967 as a vocalist. From there, he joined the Police Band in 1968 and later Cranes Band in 1969 before he and other friends formed Afrigo Band in 1974. He performed with the band since and was its leader, as of February 2015.

== Football career ==
Before becoming a musician, Matovu played football in Uganda during the late 1960s and early 1970s. He played for Nakivubo Boys, Lint Marketing Board, Police FC, Express FC, and Fiat FC. He also played for Kibuli United, Young Salumbey and Buganda.

He remained associated with SC Villa after his playing career. He served as the clubs treasurer from 2013 to 2014. In 2021, he was appointed to the clubs Board of Trustees.

== Discography ==
Some of the records and albums he released are with Afrigo Band:

Year	Title	Composer
	Afrigo Batuuse	
	Akola Bwenkanya	Charles Ssenkyanzi
	Musa	Charles Ssenkyanzi
	Enneyisa	Charles Ssenkyanzi
	Rose Guma	Charles Ssenkyanzi
	Onnemye	Charles Ssenkyanzi
	Nnemeddwa	Charles Ssenkyanzi
	Obangaina	Rachael Magoola
	Sipiidi Kendeeza	
	Olumbe Lwo'bwaavu	
	Sikulimba (Olunderebu)	

== Death ==
Matovu died on 24th September 2026 at Kibuli hospital in Kampala after sustaining serious injuries in an attack in Kibuli, market zone B, Makindye division. He was buried in Kyanja, Kampala on 25th September 2026 following Muslim funeral prayers at Kibuli and a vigil in Kyanja.

== See also ==
- Rutamirika
- Joan Kagezi
- Janani Luwum
- Basil Kiiza Bataringaya
