= Rwanda Television =

Rwandan main television channel

RBA-Rwanda Television
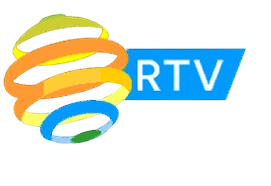
- Logo since 2014
- Country: Rwanda
- Broadcast area: National
- Headquarters: Kigali

Programming
- Languages: English and Kinyarwanda

Ownership
- Owner: Rwanda Broadcasting Agency

History
- Launched: December 31, 1992 (33 years ago)
- Former names: TVR-Télévision Rwandaise (1992-2014)

Links
- Website: https://www.rba.co.rw/tv and https://www.rba.co.rw/kc2

Rwanda Television (RTV, formerly TVR) is the oldest television channel in Rwanda. Owned by the Rwanda Broadcasting Agency (RBA) which also owns Radio Rwanda, the channel airs programming in the country's national languages of Kinyarwanda (RBA)-Kigali Channel 2 (KC2).

== History ==
=== Studies, pre-genocide ===
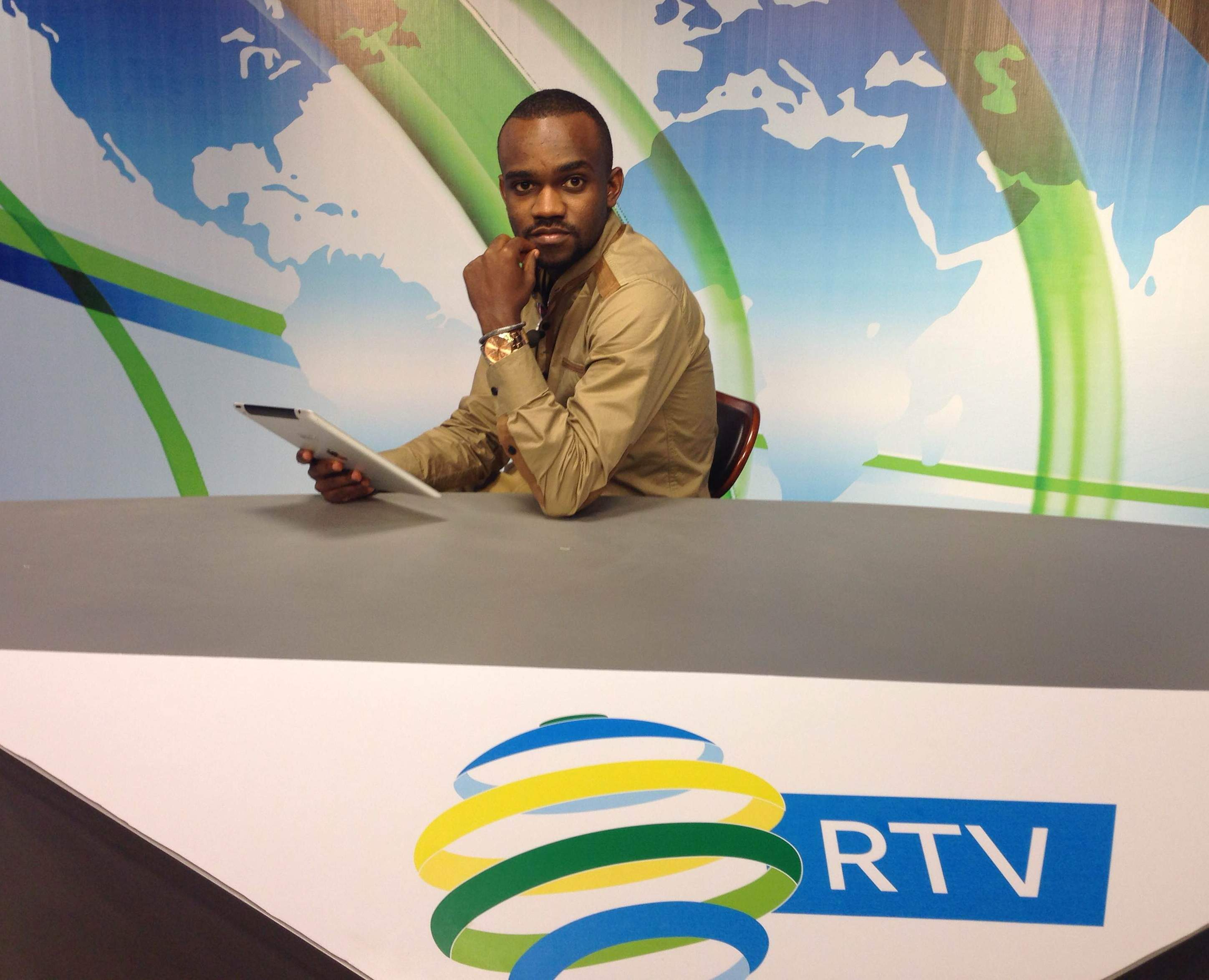
Rwanda Television news studios in 2014

Assessment studies with French aid were made in 1984 when signals from neighboring countries were received in parts of the country. In June 1988, TVR was already in the planning stages; a study was entrusted to the ITU in September, co-financed with the UNDP. However Rwanda, with its "privileged relations with France", issued a request to the French government on 23 May 1990, followed by a mission from the director of Cultural Action of the French Ministry of Cooperation and Development between 21 and 25 September, studying the implementation of TVR with high ORINFOR officials, including its conditions and modalities. A complementary study was made between 26 March and 9 April 1991 by two experts from TDF to install transmitters in the sites recommended by the ITU, not only for television, but also for FM radio.

Télévision Rwandaise was set up in December 1992. Rwanda, together with Chad, was among the last countries in Françafrique to introduce television.

Initially, it was predicted that TVR's programming would consist mainly on programming with socio-cultural topics, covering topics such as development, safety, education, environment and evolution of society. Also a priority were coverage of key important events in the political, cultural, religious and sporting sectors.

French co-operation led to the installation of a 5kW television transmitter in Kigali, its capital, followed by a 1kW Band III transmitter in Mount Huye, Butare and a 50W transmitter in Mount Kalisimbi, Ruhengeri. France also supplied TVR with technical equipment and the possibility of joint Franco-Rwandan co-productions, as well as French programming provided by CFI. The joint goals set up that 60% (40% in the initial phase) of the output was produced in Rwanda with the rest coming from overseas.

On 31 December 1992, TVR made its first broadcast with a message from President Juvénal Habyarimana, with its programming restricted to Saturdays and Sundays from 6pm to 11pm, before starting broadcasts on Fridays and, progressively, covering the whole week. Its first and provisional facilities were located at Nyarurenge, in downtown Kigali, while waiting for the permanent facilities in Gacukiro to be completed. At launch time, 70% of its programming was local, with the remaining output coming from foreign sources (films, football matches, international news offered from CFI and DW). On 6 April 1994, Habyarimana died and the start of the genocide prompted TVR to suspend its operations on 7 April. TVR is, indirectly, considered to be one of the first "victims" of the genocide.

=== Post-genocide ===
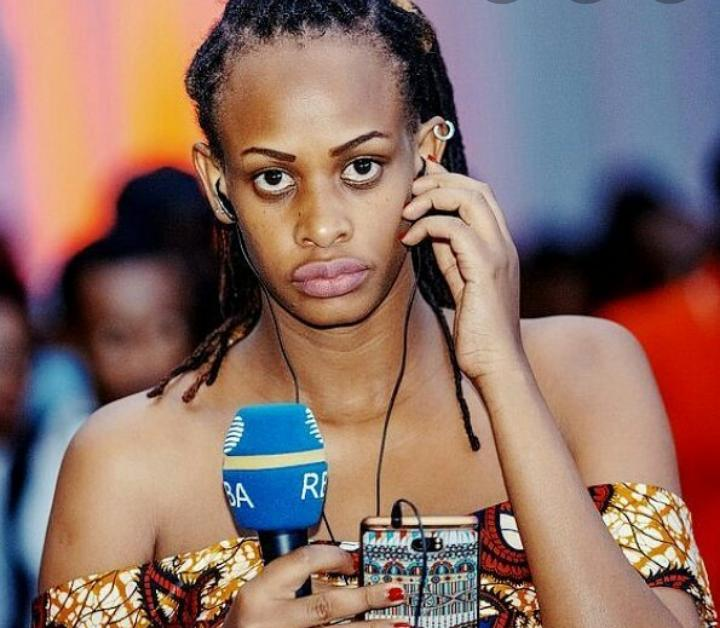
Famous Rwandan woman, Anita Pendo holding an RBA microphone

Following the massacre in July 1994, TVR's facilities were heavily damaged. The cost of reconstructing TVR was high, and American aid eased the facilitation of its rebuild. The main studio, still under construction before the Hutu-Tutsi war started, had finished, but putting the Mount Jari station operational had to be rebuilt, at a cost of US$3 million. Radio and television signals were also reinstated, also covering north-western Rwanda and neighboring parts of Zaire. American support also helped fill in the void in the technical sector, as the station had lost its resources due to the war. Broadcasts resumed in October 1994. Valence Rwamukwaya, born in Rwanda but moved to Burundi in his childhood; who was also working on Burundi's state TV upon inception in 1984, returned to Rwanda and began working at TVR.

By the end of the year, TVR was broadcasting three days a week.

In 1996, the channel finally achieved a seven-day schedule. In 1999, TVR started airing Imvaho, a program for women. In May 2002, it began carrying the daily output of the barter syndication service African Broadcast Network. As of 2006, TVR broadcast from 10am to midnight, with the bulk of the daytime schedule being filled with live simulcasts of the French service of Euronews, BBC World and Deutsche Welle's English service. A rebroadcast of CNN International aired at 11pm before closedown.

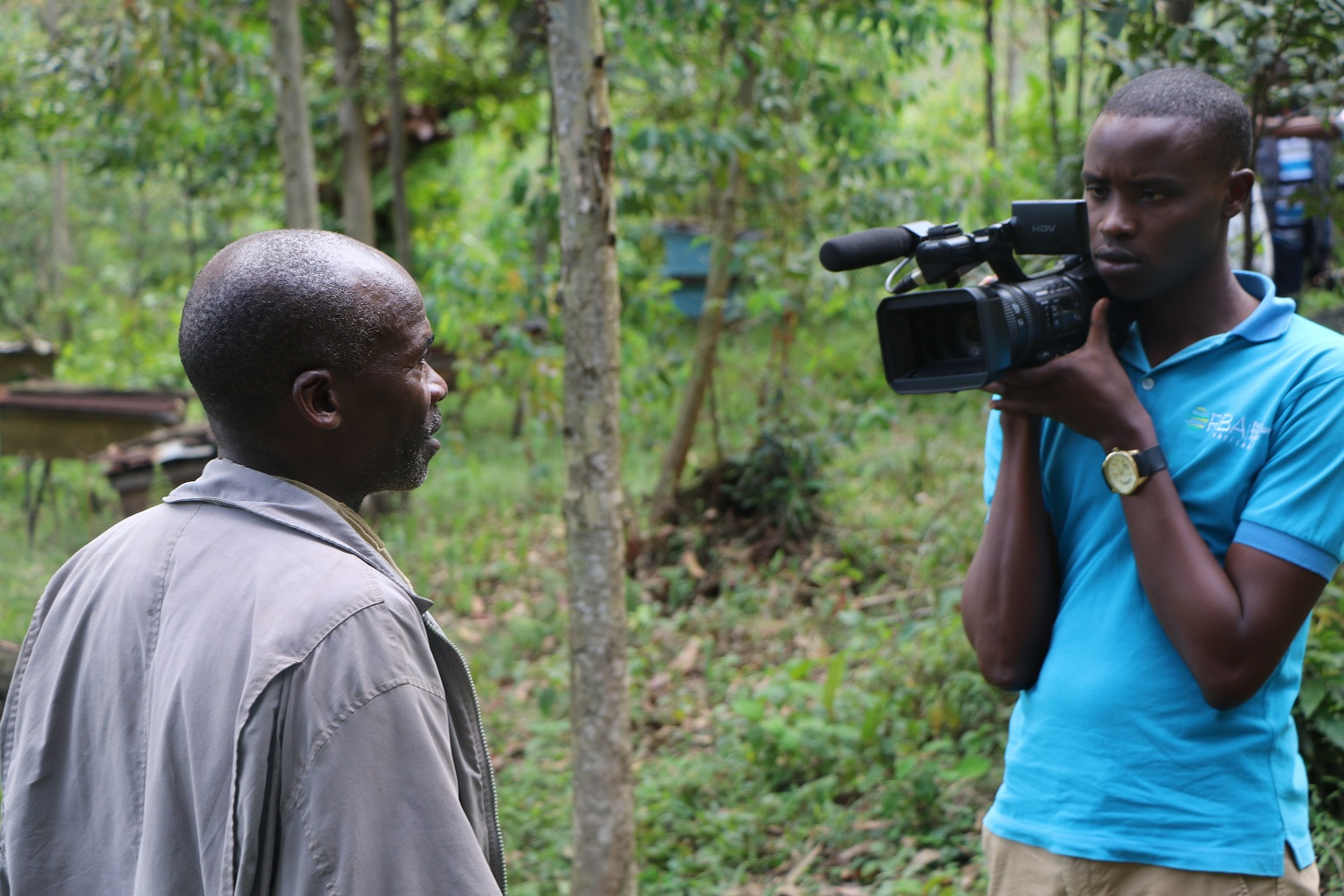
RBA employee recording something at the studio

TVR refused to air the 2008 Africa Cup of Nations due to a lack of payment with the rights holder. Its counterparts in Zambia and Ghana were facing the same issue.

In 2012, TVR lost its television monopoly.

=== Rwanda Television and conversion to high definition ===
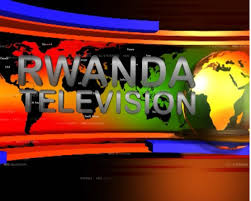
RTV news background logo

On 3 March 2016, RTV was made available on DStv, enabling the channel to have a wide satellite reach. The channel was made available to Rwandan subscribers on channel 299. On 8 November 2022, thanks to a new agreement between Canal+ Afrique and the RBA, the provider started carrying the channel in high definition, ahead of the 2022 FIFA World Cup. Only RTV's main channel (380) was converted, with the second channel (630) remaining in SD. In addition, RTV announced an outreach plan for the World Cup, enabling its broadcast to 10,000 viewers in fourteen large screens across Rwanda.

== Channels ==
=== (RBA) Rwanda TV ===
RTV is the first and main channel.

=== (RBA) Kigali Channel 2 ===
Kigali Channel 2 (KC2) is the second TV channel, focusing on entertainment and youth.

Kigali Channel 2
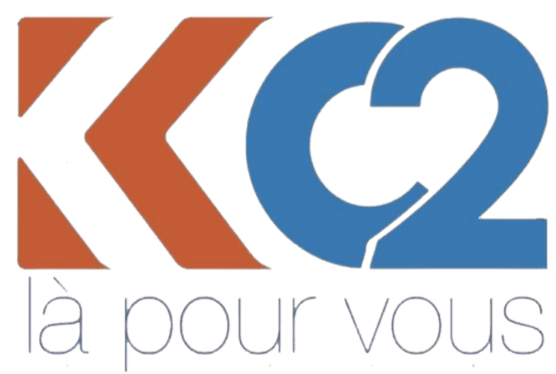
- Logo since 2019
- Country: Kigali, Rwanda
- First air date: 2019
- Availability: National
- Motto: là pour vous (lit. 'there for you')
